

Deaths in June

9: Josip Katalinski
9: Mike Mitchell

Current sporting seasons

Australian rules football 2011

Australian Football League

Auto racing 2011

Formula One
Sprint Cup
Nationwide Series
Camping World Truck Series
IRL IndyCar Series
World Rally Championship
WTCC
V8 Supercar
Formula Two
GP2 Series
GP3 Series
American Le Mans
Le Mans Series
Superleague Formula
Rolex Sports Car Series
FIA GT1 World Championship
Auto GP
Formula Renault 3.5 Series
Deutsche Tourenwagen Masters
Super GT

Baseball 2011

Major League Baseball
Nippon Professional Baseball

Basketball 2011

NBA (NBA Finals)
WNBA
France
Germany
Greece
Italy
Philippines
Governors Cup
Russia
Spain (Playoffs)
Turkey

Canadian football 2011

Canadian Football League

Cricket 2011

England:
County Championship
Clydesdale Bank 40
Friends Life t20

Football (soccer) 2011

National teams competitions
UEFA Euro 2012 qualifying
2012 Africa Cup of Nations qualification
2014 FIFA World Cup qualification
International clubs competitions
UEFA (Europe) Champions League
UEFA Europa League
Copa Libertadores (South America)
AFC (Asia) Champions League
AFC Cup
CAF (Africa) Champions League
CAF Confederation Cup
Domestic (national) competitions
Argentina
Brazil
Japan
Norway
Russia
Major League Soccer (USA & Canada)
Women's Professional Soccer (USA)

Golf 2011

PGA Tour
European Tour
LPGA Tour
Champions Tour

Ice hockey 2011

National Hockey League (Stanley Cup Finals)

Motorcycle racing 2011

Moto GP
Superbike World Championship
Supersport World Championship

Rugby league 2011

Super League
NRL

Rugby union 2011

Top 14
Super Rugby

Snooker 2011

Players Tour Championship

Tennis 2011

ATP World Tour
WTA Tour

Volleyball 2011

National teams competitions
World League
Men's European League
Women's European League

Days of the month

June 30, 2011 (Thursday)

Athletics
Samsung Diamond League:
Athletissima in Lausanne, Switzerland:
Men:
100m: Asafa Powell  9.78
110m hurdles: Dayron Robles  13.12
400m: Jermaine Gonzales  45.27
400m hurdles: David Greene  48.41
800m: David Rudisha  1:44.15
5000m: Vincent Chepkok  12:59.13
Triple jump: Teddy Tamgho  17.91m
Pole vault: Renaud Lavillenie  5.83m
Shot put: Christian Cantwell  21.83m
Javelin throw: Andreas Thorkildsen  88.19m
Women:
100m hurdles: Sally Pearson  12.47
200m: Mariya Ryemyen  22.85
400m: Amantle Montsho  50.23
1500m: Morgan Uceny  4:05.52
3000m steeplechase: Milcah Chemos Cheywa  9:19.87
Long jump: Brittney Reese  6.85m
High jump: Anna Chicherova  1.95m
Discus throw: Yarelis Barrios  64.29m

Basketball
EuroBasket Women in Łódź, Poland:
Quarterfinals:
 44–56 
 58–66 
Classification round:  75–84

Cricket
India in the West Indies:
2nd Test in Bridgetown, Barbados, day 3:  201 & 23/0 (5.4 overs);  190 (73.5 overs; Ishant Sharma 6/55). India lead by 34 runs with 10 wickets remaining.

Field hockey
Women's Champions Trophy in Amsterdam, Netherlands:
Pool C:
 5–3 
 1–2 
Standings (after 2 matches): Korea, Netherlands 4 points, Argentina, New Zealand 1.
Pool D:
 2–2 
 1–0 
Standings (after 2 matches): Australia, England 4 points, China 2, Germany 0.

Football (soccer)
FIFA Women's World Cup in Germany:
Group A (teams in bold advance to the quarterfinals):
 0–4  in Bochum
 1–0  in Frankfurt
Standings (after 2 matches): France, Germany 6 points, Nigeria, Canada 0.
FIFA U-17 World Cup in Mexico:
Round of 16:
 4–0  in Querétaro
 1–1 (4–2 pen.)  in Pachuca
 3–2  in Querétaro
 2–0  in Pachuca
UEFA Europa League First qualifying round, first leg:
Banants  0–1  Olimpi Rustavi
AZAL Baku  1–1  Minsk
Banga Gargždai  0–4  Qarabağ
Narva Trans  1–4  Rabotnički
Rad  6–0  Tre Penne
Daugava Daugavpils  0–5  Tromsø
Elfsborg  4–0  Fola Esch
Honka  0–0  Nõmme Kalju
Varaždin  5–1  Lusitanos
Ferencváros  3–0  Ulisses
UE Santa Coloma  0–1  Paks
Aalesund  4–1  Neath
Dinamo Tbilisi  2–0  Milsami Orhei
Spartak Trnava  3–0  Zeta
ÍF Fuglafjørður  1–3  KR Reykjavík
ÍBV Vestmannaeyar  1–0  St Patrick's Athletic
Käerjéng 97  1–1  Häcken
The New Saints  1–1  Cliftonville
Fulham  3–0  NSÍ Runavík
Jagiellonia Białystok  1–0  Irtysh Pavlodar
Birkirkara  0–1  Vllaznia Shkodër
Renova  2–1  Glentoran
Koper  1–1  Shakhter Karagandy
Široki Brijeg  0–0  Olimpija Ljubljana
Budućnost Podgorica  1–3  Flamurtari Vlorë

Taekwondo
World Olympic Qualification Tournament in Baku, Azerbaijan (top 3 qualify for 2012 Olympics):
Men's 58 kg:  Penek Karaket   Gabriel Mercedes   Lee Dae-Hoon 
Women's 67 kg:  Kim Mi-Kyung   Farida Azizova   Elin Johansson

Tennis
Grand Slams:
Wimbledon Championships in London, England, day 10:
Women's Singles Semi-Finals:
Petra Kvitová  [8] def. Victoria Azarenka  [4] 6–1, 3–6, 6–2
Kvitová reaches her first Grand Slam final, and becomes the first Czech woman to reach a Grand Slam singles final since Jana Novotná at the 1998 Wimbledon Championships.
Maria Sharapova  [5] def. Sabine Lisicki  6–4, 6–3
Sharapova reaches her second Wimbledon final, and her fifth Grand Slam final overall.

Volleyball
FIVB World League, Week 6 (teams in bold advance to the final round):
Pool A:  0–3 
Standings: Brazil 30 points (12 matches),  18 (10), Poland 18 (12),  0 (10).
Pool B:
 3–1 
 3–1 
Standings (after 11 matches): Russia 29 points, Bulgaria 21, Germany 12, Japan 4.
Pool C:
 3–2 
 0–3 
Standings: Argentina 25 points (12 matches), Serbia 21 (12), Finland 14 (11), Portugal 9 (11).

June 29, 2011 (Wednesday)

Basketball
EuroBasket Women in Łódź, Poland:
Quarterfinals:
 72–83 
 79–63

Cricket
India in the West Indies:
2nd Test in Bridgetown, Barbados, day 2:  201;  98/5 (37.3 overs). West Indies trail by 103 runs with 5 wickets remaining in the 1st innings.
Netherlands in Scotland:
2nd ODI in Aberdeen:  180/9 (50 overs);  162/5 (39.1/41 overs). Scotland win by 5 wickets (D/L); win 2-match series 2–0.

Football (soccer)
FIFA Women's World Cup in Germany:
Group D:
 1–0  in Augsburg
 1–0  in Mönchengladbach
2014 FIFA World Cup qualification (AFC) First Round, first leg:
 2–1 
 3–0 
 4–2 
 1–1 
 0–2 
 6–0 
 2–1 
 1–0 
FIFA U-17 World Cup in Mexico:
Round of 16:
 4–0  in Torreón
 2–0  in Guadalajara
 1–2  in Morelia
 6–0  in Monterrey

Tennis
Grand Slams:
Wimbledon Championships in London, England, day 9:
Men's Singles Quarter-Finals:
Rafael Nadal  [1] def. Mardy Fish  [10] 6–3, 6–3, 5–7, 6–4
Novak Djokovic  [2] def. Bernard Tomic  6–2, 3–6, 6–3, 7–5
Jo-Wilfried Tsonga  [12] def. Roger Federer  [3] 3–6, 6–7(3), 6–4, 6–4, 6–4
Andy Murray  [4] def. Feliciano López  6–3, 6–4, 6–4

Volleyball
FIVB World League, Week 6 (teams in bold advance to the final round):
Pool A:  1–3 
Standings: Brazil 27 points (11 matches), Poland 18 (11),  18 (10),  0 (10).
Pool C:  3–1 
Standings: Argentina 22 points (11 matches), Serbia 21 (11),  12 (10),  8 (10).
Pool D:
 3–0 
 3–1 
Standings (after 11 matches): Italy 28 points, Cuba 20, South Korea 10, France 8.

June 28, 2011 (Tuesday)

Baseball
College World Series Final in Omaha, Nebraska (best-of-3 series):
Game 2: South Carolina 5, Florida 2. South Carolina wins series 2–0.
The Gamecocks win their second successive NCAA baseball title.

Cricket
Sri Lanka in England:
1st ODI in London:  229/8 (32/32 overs);  121 (27 overs). England win by 110 runs (D/L); lead 5-match series 1–0.
India in the West Indies:
2nd Test in Bridgetown, Barbados, day 1:  201 (68 overs);  30/3 (12 overs). West Indies trail by 171 runs with 7 wickets remaining in the 1st innings.
Netherlands in Scotland:
1st ODI in Aberdeen:  255/7 (50 overs);  240 (49 overs). Scotland win by 15 runs; lead 2-match series 1–0.

Field hockey
Women's Champions Trophy in Amsterdam, Netherlands (teams in bold advance to pool C):
Pool A:
 0–0 
 1–1 
Final standings: Argentina 7 points, Korea 3, England, China 2.
Pool B:
 1–0 
 0–0 
Final standings: Netherlands 7 points, New Zealand 4, Germany, Australia 3.

Football (soccer)
FIFA Women's World Cup in Germany:
Group C:
 0–1  in Leverkusen
 2–0  in Dresden
UEFA Champions League First qualifying round, first leg:
FC Santa Coloma  0–2  F91 Dudelange
Tre Fiori  0–3  Valletta

Ice hockey
The Hockey Hall of Fame announces its 2011 induction class, consisting of Ed Belfour, Doug Gilmour, Mark Howe, and Joe Nieuwendyk.

Tennis
Grand Slams:
Wimbledon Championships in London, England, day 8:
Women's Singles Quarter-Finals:
Victoria Azarenka  [4] def. Tamira Paszek  6–3, 6–1
Maria Sharapova  [5] def. Dominika Cibulková  [24] 6–1, 6–1
Petra Kvitová  [8] def. Tsvetana Pironkova  [32] 6–3, 6–7(5), 6–2
Sabine Lisicki  def. Marion Bartoli  [9] 6–4, 6–7(4), 6–1

June 27, 2011 (Monday)

Baseball
College World Series Final in Omaha, Nebraska (best-of-3 series):
Game 1: South Carolina 2, Florida 1 (11 innings). South Carolina lead series 1–0.

Basketball
EuroBasket Women in Poland (teams in bold advance to the quarter-finals):
Group E in Bydgoszcz:
 62–59 
 63–59 
 56–65 
Final standings: Czech Republic, Lithuania 9 points, Russia 8, Turkey, Belarus 7, Great Britain 5.

Football (soccer)
FIFA Women's World Cup in Germany:
Group B:
 2–1  in Bochum
 1–1  in Wolfsburg
FIFA U-17 World Cup in Mexico (teams in bold advance to the knockout stage):
Group F:  1–1  in Querétaro
Final standings:  7 points, Australia 4, Denmark 1.

Tennis
Grand Slams:
Wimbledon Championships in London, England, day 7:
Men's Singles Fourth Round:
Rafael Nadal  [1] def. Juan Martín del Potro  [24] 7–6(6), 3–6, 7–6(4), 6–4
Novak Djokovic  [2] def. Michaël Llodra  [19] 6–3, 6–3, 6–3
Roger Federer  [3] def. Mikhail Youzhny  [18] 6–7(5), 6–3, 6–3, 6–3
Andy Murray  [4] def. Richard Gasquet  [17] 7–6(3), 6–3, 6–2
Mardy Fish  [10] def. Tomáš Berdych  [6] 7–6(5), 6–4, 6–4
Jo-Wilfried Tsonga  [12] def. David Ferrer  [7] 6–3, 6–4, 7–6(1)
Feliciano López  def. Łukasz Kubot  3–6, 6–7(5), 7–6(7), 7–5, 7–5
Bernard Tomic  def. Xavier Malisse  6–1, 7–5, 6–4
Women's Singles Fourth Round:
Dominika Cibulková  [24] def. Caroline Wozniacki  [1] 1–6, 7–6(5), 7–5
Victoria Azarenka  [4] def. Nadia Petrova  6–2, 6–2
Maria Sharapova  [5] def. Peng Shuai  [20] 6–4, 6–2
Marion Bartoli  [9] def. Serena Williams  [7] 6–3, 7–6(6)
Petra Kvitová  [8] def. Yanina Wickmayer  [19] 6–0, 6–2
Tsvetana Pironkova  [32] def. Venus Williams  [23] 6–2, 6–3
Sabine Lisicki  def. Petra Cetkovská  7–6(3), 6–1
Tamira Paszek  def. Ksenia Pervak  6–2, 2–6, 6–3

June 26, 2011 (Sunday)

Auto racing
Formula One:
 in Valencia, Spain: (1) Sebastian Vettel  (Red Bull–Renault) (2) Fernando Alonso  (Ferrari) (3) Mark Webber  (Red Bull-Renault)
Drivers' championship standings (after 8 of 19 races): (1) Vettel 186 points (2) Jenson Button  (McLaren–Mercedes) & Webber 109
Sprint Cup Series:
Toyota/Save Mart 350 in Sonoma, California: (1)  Kurt Busch (Dodge; Penske Racing) (2)  Jeff Gordon (Chevrolet; Hendrick Motorsports) (3)  Carl Edwards (Ford; Roush Fenway Racing)
Drivers' championship standings (after 16 of 36 races): (1) Edwards 573 points (2)  Kevin Harvick (Chevrolet; Richard Childress Racing) 548 (3)  Jimmie Johnson (Chevrolet; Hendrick Motorsports) 540

Badminton
BWF Super Series:
Indonesia Super Series Premier in Jakarta:
Men's singles: Lee Chong Wei  def. Peter Gade  21–11, 21–7
Women's singles: Wang Yihan  def. Saina Nehwal  12–21, 23–21, 21–14
Men's doubles: Cai Yun /Fu Haifeng  def. Chai Biao /Guo Zhendong  21–13, 21–12
Women's doubles: Wang Xiaoli /Yu Yang  def. Vita Marissa /Nadya Melati  21–12, 21–10
Mixed doubles: Zhang Nan /Zhao Yunlei  def. Tontowi Ahmad /Liliyana Natsir  20–22, 21–14, 21–9

Basketball
EuroBasket Women in Poland:
Group F in Katowice (teams in bold advance to the quarter-finals):
 58–54 
 71–75 
 70–74 
Final standings: Montenegro 10 points, Latvia, France 8, Croatia, Spain 7, Poland 5.

Equestrianism
Show jumping – British Jumping Derby meeting at Hickstead (CSI 4*):  Tina Fletcher  on Promised Land  five-way tie; best time: Shane Breen  on Gold Rain

Field hockey
Women's Champions Trophy in Amsterdam, Netherlands (teams in bold advance to pool C):
Pool A:
 2–2 
 1–4 
Standings (after 2 matches): Argentina 6 points, Korea 2, England, China 1.
Pool B:
 2–3 
 1–2 
Standings (after 2 matches): Netherlands 6 points, New Zealand, Germany 3, Australia 0.

Football (soccer)
FIFA Women's World Cup in Germany:
Group A:
 0–1  in Sinsheim
 2–1  in Berlin
FIFA U-17 World Cup in Mexico (teams in bold advance to the knockout stage):
Group E:
 0–2  in Guadalajara
 0–2  in Querétaro
Final standings: Germany 9 points, Ecuador 6, Panama 3, Burkina Faso 0.
Group F:
 0–1  in Querétaro — match abandoned after 25 minutes due to heavy rain and lightning.
 3–3  in Guadalajara
Standings: Brazil 7 points (3 matches), Côte d'Ivoire 4 (3), Australia 3 (2), Denmark 0 (2).

Golf
Women's majors:
Wegmans LPGA Championship in Pittsford, New York:
Leaderboard after final round (USA unless stated): (1) Yani Tseng  269 (−19) (2) Morgan Pressel 279 (−9) (T3) Paula Creamer, Cristie Kerr & Suzann Pettersen  280 (−8)
Tseng wins the tournament for the second time, for her fourth major title and eighth LPGA Tour title. Her score in relation to par ties the record shared by Dottie Pepper at the 1999 Kraft Nabisco Championship, Karen Stupples at the 2004 British Open, and Kerr at the 2010 LPGA Championship.
PGA Tour:
Travelers Championship in Cromwell, Connecticut:
Winner: Fredrik Jacobson  260 (−20)
Jacobson wins his first PGA Tour title.
European Tour:
BMW International Open in Munich, Germany:
Winner: Pablo Larrazábal  272 (−16)PO
Larrazábal defeats Sergio García  on the fifth playoff hole to win his second European Tour title.
Champions Tour:
Dick's Sporting Goods Open in Endicott, New York:
Winner: John Huston  200 (−16)
In his third Tour start, Huston wins his first title.

Horse racing
Canadian Thoroughbred Triple Crown:
Queen's Plate in Toronto:  Inglorious (trainer: Josie Carroll; jockey: Luis Contreras)  Hippolytus (trainer: Mark Casse; jockey: Tyler Pizarro)  Pender Harbour (trainer: Michael De Paulo; jockey: Chantal Sutherland)
Irish Derby in Newbridge, County Kildare (all trained by Aidan O'Brien):  Treasure Beach (jockey: Colm O'Donoghue)  Seville (jockey: Seamie Heffernan)  Memphis Tennessee (jockey: Joseph O'Brien)
Aidan O'Brien trains the race winner for the sixth consecutive year, and a record-extending ninth time overall.

Mixed martial arts
UFC Live: Kongo vs. Barry in Pittsburgh, Pennsylvania, United States:
Heavyweight bout: Cheick Kongo  def. Pat Barry  via KO (punch)
Welterweight bout: Charlie Brenneman  def. Rick Story  via unanimous decision (29–28, 29–28, 29–28)
Welterweight bout: Matt Brown  def. John Howard  via unanimous decision (29–28, 29–28, 29–28)
Heavyweight bout: Matt Mitrione  def. Christian Morecraft  via KO (punches)

Rugby union
IRB Junior World Championship in Italy:
11th place game in Rovigo:  22–34 
9th place game in Rovigo:  14–15 
7th place game in Treviso:  38–24 
5th place game in Treviso:  17–104 
Third place game in Padua:  17–30 
Final in Padua:  22–33 
New Zealand win the title for the fourth successive time.

Volleyball
FIVB World League, Week 5 (teams in bold advance to the final round):
Pool B:  3–2 
Standings (after 10 matches):  29 points, Bulgaria 18,  9, Japan 4.
Pool C:  1–3 
Standings (after 10 matches):  22 points, Serbia 18,  12, Portugal 8.
Pool D:
 1–3 
 3–0 
Standings (after 10 matches): Italy 25 points, Cuba 20, South Korea 10, France 5.
Men's European League, Leg 5 (team in bold advances to the final round):
Pool B:  2–3 
Standings (after 10 matches):  26 points, Netherlands 22, Greece 8,  4.
Pool C:
 1–3 
 3–0 
Standings (after 10 matches): Romania 21 points, Slovakia 18, Belarus 14, Turkey 7.
Women's European League, Leg 5 (teams in bold advance to the final round):
Pool A:
 1–3 
 3–0 
Standings (after 10 matches): Serbia 29 points, France 16, Spain 13, Greece 2.
Pool C:
 3–1 
 3–0 
Standings (after 10 matches): Turkey 24 points, Romania 17, Belarus 15, Croatia 4.

June 25, 2011 (Saturday)

Auto racing
Nationwide Series:
Bucyrus 200 in Elkhart Lake, Wisconsin: (1)  Reed Sorenson (Chevrolet; Turner Motorsports) (2)  Ron Fellows (Chevrolet; JR Motorsports) (3)  Jacques Villeneuve (Dodge; Penske Racing)
Drivers' championship standings (after 16 of 34 races): (1) Sorenson 568 points (2)  Elliott Sadler (Chevrolet; Kevin Harvick Incorporated) 563 (3)  Ricky Stenhouse Jr. (Ford; Roush Fenway Racing) 561
IndyCar Series:
Iowa Corn Indy 250 in Newton, Iowa: (1) Marco Andretti  (Andretti Autosport) (2) Tony Kanaan  (KV Racing Technology – Lotus) (3) Scott Dixon  (Chip Ganassi Racing)
Drivers' championship standings (after 9 of 18 races): (1) Dario Franchitti  (Chip Ganassi Racing) 303 points (2) Will Power  (Team Penske) 283 (3) Dixon 230

Basketball
EuroBasket Women in Poland (teams in bold advance to the quarter-finals):
Group E in Bydgoszcz:
 57–64 
 69–55 
 68–50 
Standings (after 4 matches): Lithuania 8 points, Czech Republic 7, Russia, Belarus 6, Turkey 5, Great Britain 4.

Cricket
Sri Lanka in England:
Only T20I in Bristol:  136/9 (20 overs);  137/1 (17.2 overs). Sri Lanka win by 9 wickets.

Equestrianism
Show jumping – Global Champions Tour:
5th Competition in Monte Carlo (CSI 5*):  Rolf-Göran Bengtsson  on Casall  Christian Ahlmann  on Taloubet Z  Rodrigo Pessoa  on Let's Fly
Standings (after 5 of 10 competitions): (1) Edwina Alexander  155 points (2) Ludger Beerbaum  151.5 (3) Álvaro de Miranda Neto  123

Field hockey
Women's Champions Trophy in Amsterdam, Netherlands:
Pool A:
 2–2 
 1–0 
Pool B:
 1–0 
 3–0

Football (soccer)
CONCACAF Gold Cup in the United States:
Final:  2–4  in Pasadena
Mexico win the title for the sixth time and a spot in the 2013 FIFA Confederations Cup in Brazil.
UEFA European Under-21 Championship in Denmark:
Olympic play-off:  0–1  in Aalborg
Belarus qualify for the 2012 Olympic tournament.
Final:  2–0  in Aarhus
Spain win the title for the third time.
FIFA U-17 World Cup in Mexico (teams in bold advance to the knockout stage):
Group C:
 0–2  in Torreón
 0–0  in Pachuca
Final standings: England 7 points, Uruguay 6, Canada 2, Rwanda 1.
Group D:
 0–0  in Pachuca
 1–2  in Torreón
Final standings: Uzbekistan 6 points, United States, New Zealand 4, Czech Republic 3.

Golf
Women's majors:
Wegmans LPGA Championship in Pittsford, New York:
Leaderboard after third round: (1) Yani Tseng  203 (−13) (T2) Cindy LaCrosse  & Morgan Pressel  208 (−8)

Inline hockey
IIHF World Championship in Pardubice, Czech Republic:
Bronze medal game:   13–7 
Gold medal match:   3–2  
The Czech Republic win the title for the first time.

Motorcycle racing
Moto GP:
Dutch TT in Assen, Netherlands:
MotoGP: (1) Ben Spies  (Yamaha) (2) Casey Stoner  (Honda) (3) Andrea Dovizioso  (Honda)
Riders' championship standings (after 7 of 18 races): (1) Stoner 136 points (2) Jorge Lorenzo  (Yamaha) 108 (3) Dovizioso 99
Moto2: (1) Marc Márquez  (Suter) (2) Kenan Sofuoğlu  (Suter) (3) Bradley Smith  (Tech 3)
Riders' championship standings (after 7 of 17 races): (1) Stefan Bradl  (Kalex) 127 points (2) Márquez 70 (3) Simone Corsi  (FTR) 67
125cc: (1) Maverick Viñales  (Aprilia) (2) Luis Salom  (Aprilia) (3) Sergio Gadea  (Aprilia)
Riders' championship standings (after 7 of 17 races): (1) Nicolás Terol  (Aprilia) 128 points (2) Jonas Folger  (Aprilia) 101 (3) Sandro Cortese  (Aprilia) & Johann Zarco  (Derbi) 94

Rugby union
Super Rugby Finals:
Qualifier 2 in Nelson: Crusaders  36–8  Sharks

Tennis
Grand Slams:
Wimbledon Championships in London, England, day 6:
Men's Singles Third Round:
Rafael Nadal  [1] def. Gilles Müller  7–6(6), 7–6(5), 6–0
Novak Djokovic  [2] def. Marcos Baghdatis  [32] 6–4, 4–6, 6–3, 6–4
Roger Federer  [3] def. David Nalbandian  [28] 6–4, 6–2, 6–4
Bernard Tomic  def. Robin Söderling  [5] 6–1, 6–4, 7–5
Tomáš Berdych  [6] def. Alex Bogomolov Jr.  6–2, 6–4, 6–3
David Ferrer  [7] def. Karol Beck  6–4, 6–3, 6–3
Łukasz Kubot  def. Gaël Monfils  [9] 6–3, 3–6, 6–3, 6–3
Mardy Fish  [10] def. Robin Haase  6–3, 6–7(5), 6–2, 1–1 retired
Women's Singles Third Round:
Caroline Wozniacki  [1] def. Jarmila Gajdošová  [27] 6–3, 6–2
Maria Sharapova  [5] def. Klára Zakopalová  6–2, 6–3
Tamira Paszek  def. Francesca Schiavone  [6] 6–3, 4–6, 11–9
Serena Williams  [7] def. Maria Kirilenko  [26] 6–3, 6–2
Marion Bartoli  [9] def. Flavia Pennetta  [21] 7–5, 4–6, 9–7

Volleyball
FIVB World League, Week 5 (teams in bold advance to the final round):
Pool A:
 3–0 
 3–1 
Standings (after 10 matches): Brazil 24 points, Poland, United States 18, Puerto Rico 0.
Pool B:  3–0 
Standings:  29 points (10 matches), Bulgaria 16 (9),  9 (10), Japan 3 (9).
Pool C:  2–3 
Standings:  22 points (10 matches), Serbia 15 (9),  12 (10), Portugal 8 (9).
Men's European League, Leg 5 (teams in bold advance to the final round):
Pool A:
 3–2 
 3–1 
Standings (after 10 matches): Slovenia 23 points, Belgium 15, Great Britain, Croatia 11.
Pool B:
 0–3 
 2–3 
Standings: Spain 26 points (10 matches), Netherlands 20 (9), Greece 7 (9), Austria 4 (10).
Pool C:
 3–1 
 2–3 
Standings (after 9 matches): Romania, Slovakia 18 points, Belarus 11, Turkey 7.
Women's European League, Leg 5 (teams in bold advance to the final round):
Pool A:
 1–3 
 3–1 
Standings (after 9 matches): Serbia 26 points, France, Spain 13, Greece 2.
Pool B:
 3–0 
 3–0 
Standings (after 10 matches): Bulgaria 26 points, Czech Republic 24, Hungary 6, Israel 4.
Pool C:
 1–3 
 0–3 
Standings (after 9 matches): Turkey 24 points, Romania 17, Belarus 12, Croatia 1.
Asian Women's Club Championship in Vĩnh Phúc, Vietnam:
3rd place: Thong Tin Lien Viet Bank  0–3   Zhetysu Almaty
Final:  Chang  3–0   Tianjin Bridgestone
Chang win the title for the first time.

June 24, 2011 (Friday)

Basketball
EuroBasket Women in Poland (teams in bold advance to the quarter-finals):
Group F in Katowice:
 66–57 
 64–56 
 73–68 
Standings (after 4 matches): Montenegro 8 points, Latvia 7, France, Spain 6, Croatia 5, Poland 4.

Boxing
European Men's Championships in Ankara, Turkey:
Light flyweight:  Salman Alizade   Belik Galanov   Georgi Andonov  & Charlie Edwards 
Flyweight:  Andrew Selby   Georgy Balakshin   Alexander Riscan  & Vincenzo Picardi 
Bantamweight:  Veaceslav Gojan   Dmitriy Polyanskiy   Razvan Andreiana  & Furkan Ulaş Memiş 
Lightweight:  Fatih Keleş   Domenico Valentino   Vladimir Saruhanyan  & Volodymyr Matviychuk 
Light welterweight:  Ray Moylette   Tom Stalker   Vincenzo Mangiacapre  & Gaybatulla Hajialiyev 
Welterweight:  Fred Evans   Magomed Nurutdinov   Adriani Vastine  & Zaal Kvachatadze 
Middleweight:  Maxim Koptyakov   Adem Kılıççı   Jaba Khocitashvili  & Dmitro Mitrofanov 
Light heavyweight:  Joe Ward   Nikita Ivanov   Imre Szellő  & Hrvoje Sep 
Heavyweight:  Teymur Mammadov   Tervel Pulev   Bahram Muzaffer  & Johann Witt 
Super heavyweight:  Magomed Omarov   Roberto Cammarelle   Mikheil Bakhtidze  & Mihai Nistor

Cricket
ICC Intercontinental Cup, round 1:
In Aberdeen, day 4:  309 (107 overs; Majid Haq 120*, Mudassar Bukhari 5/79);  306/8 (70 overs). Match drawn.

Football (soccer)
FIFA U-17 World Cup in Mexico (teams in bold advance to the quarter-finals):
Group A:
 1–1  in Morelia
 3–2  in Monterrey
Final standings: Mexico 9 points, Congo 4, North Korea 2, Netherlands 1.
Group B:
 3–1  in Morelia
 1–1  in Monterrey
Final standings: Japan 7 points, France 5, Argentina 3, Jamaica 1.

Golf
Women's majors:
Wegmans LPGA Championship in Pittsford, New York (USA unless stated):
Leaderboard after first round: (1) Yani Tseng  66 (−6) (2) Paula Creamer 67 (−5) (T3) Diana D'Alessio, Meena Lee , Stacy Prammanasudh & Angela Stanford 68 (−4)
Leaderboard after second round: (1) Tseng 136 (−8) (2) Pat Hurst 137 (−7) (T3) Minea Blomqvist , Hee Young Park  & Morgan Pressel 138 (−6)

Ice hockey
NHL Entry Draft in St. Paul, Minnesota: Ryan Nugent-Hopkins of the Red Deer Rebels is selected as the number one overall pick by the Edmonton Oilers.

Rugby union
Super Rugby Finals:
Qualifier 1 in Auckland: Blues  26–13  Waratahs

Tennis
Grand Slams:
Wimbledon Championships in London, England, day 5:
Men's singles:
Second Round: David Ferrer  [7] def. Ryan Harrison  6–7(6), 6–1, 4–6, 6–3, 6–2
Third Round:
Rafael Nadal  [1] vs. Gilles Müller  7–6(6) (match suspended)
Andy Murray  [4] def. Ivan Ljubičić  6–4, 4–6, 6–1, 7–6(4)
Alex Bogomolov Jr.  vs. Tomáš Berdych  [6] 2–6, 4–6, 3–4 (match suspended)
Feliciano López  def. Andy Roddick  [8] 7–6(2), 7–6(2), 6–4
Gaël Monfils  [9] vs. Łukasz Kubot  3–6, 6–3, 3–3 (match suspended)
Women's Singles:
Second Round:
Caroline Wozniacki  [1] def. Virginie Razzano  6–1, 6–3
Maria Sharapova  [5] def. Laura Robson  7–6(4), 6–3
Marion Bartoli  [9] def. Lourdes Domínguez Lino  4–6, 7–5, 6–2
Third Round:
Tsvetana Pironkova  [32] def. Vera Zvonareva  [2] 6–2, 6–3
Victoria Azarenka  [4] def. Daniela Hantuchová  [25] 6–3, 3–6, 6–2
Francesca Schiavone  [6] vs. Tamira Paszek  6–3, 4–6, 2–3 (match suspended)
Petra Kvitová  [8] def. Roberta Vinci  [29] 6–3, 6–3

Volleyball
FIVB World League, Week 5 (teams in bold advance to the final round):
Pool A:
 3–1 
 1–3 
Standings (after 9 matches): Brazil 24 points, Poland, United States 15, Puerto Rico 0.
Pool B:  1–3 
Standings: Russia 29 points (10 matches),  13 (8), Germany 9 (10),  3 (8).
Pool C:  1–3 
Standings: Argentina 22 points (10 matches),  13 (8), Finland 12 (10),  7 (8).
Pool D:
 3–0 
 2–3 
Standings (after 9 matches): Italy 22 points, Cuba 17, South Korea 10, France 5.
Men's European League, Leg 5:
Pool A:
 2–3 
 0–3 
Standings (after 9 matches): Slovenia 23 points, Belgium 14, Great Britain 9, Croatia 8.
Pool B:  1–3 
Standings: Spain 24 points (9 matches),  17 (8),  7 (8), Austria 3 (9).
Women's European League, Leg 5:
Pool B:
 3–1 
 3–1 
Standings (after 9 matches): Bulgaria 23 points, Czech Republic 21, Hungary 6, Israel 4.

June 23, 2011 (Thursday)

Basketball
EuroBasket Women in Poland (teams in bold advance to the quarter-finals):
Group E in Bydgoszcz:
 63–64 
 62–51 
 51–56 
Standings (after 3 matches): Czech Republic, Lithuania 6 points, Belarus 5, Russia 4, Turkey, Great Britain 3.
NBA draft in Newark, New Jersey: Kyrie Irving of the Duke Blue Devils is selected as the number one overall pick by the Cleveland Cavaliers.

Cricket
ICC Intercontinental Cup, round 1:
In Aberdeen, day 3:  237/3 (75 overs); .
India in the West Indies:
1st Test in Kingston, Jamaica, day 4:  246 & 252;  173 & 262 (68.2 overs). India win by 63 runs; lead 3-match series 1–0.

Football (soccer)
FIFA U-17 World Cup in Mexico (teams in bold advance to the knockout stage):
Group E in Querétaro:
 0–3 
 1–2 
Standings (after 2 matches): Germany 6 points, Panama, Ecuador 3, Burkina Faso 0.
Group F in Guadalajara:
 0–1 
 4–2 
Standings (after 2 matches): Brazil 6 points, Côte d'Ivoire, Australia 3, Denmark 0.
Friendly international (top 10 in FIFA World Rankings):
(7)  3–0 
Friendly women's internationals (top 10 in FIFA Women's World Rankings):
(4)  1–1 (5) 
 2–0 (10)

Golf
Women's majors:
Wegmans LPGA Championship in Pittsford, New York:
Leaderboard after first day (USA unless stated): (1) Yani Tseng  66 (−6) (2) Paula Creamer 67 (−5) (T3) Diana D'Alessio, Meena Lee , Stacy Prammanasudh & Angela Stanford 68 (−4)
Six players will complete their first rounds on June 24.

Tennis
Grand Slams:
Wimbledon Championships in London, England, day 4:
Men's singles second round:
Novak Djokovic  [2] def. Kevin Anderson  6–3, 6–4, 6–2
Roger Federer  [3] def. Adrian Mannarino  6–2, 6–3, 6–2
Robin Söderling  [5] def. Lleyton Hewitt  6–7(5), 3–6, 7–5, 6–4, 6–4
David Ferrer  [7] vs. Ryan Harrison  6–7(6), 6–1, 4–6, 4–2 (match suspended)
Women's Singles Second Round:
Sabine Lisicki  def. Li Na  [3] 3–6, 6–4, 8–6
Francesca Schiavone  [6] def. Barbora Záhlavová-Strýcová  7–5, 6–3
Serena Williams  [7] def. Simona Halep  3–6, 6–2, 6–1

Volleyball
FIVB World League, Week 5 (team in bold advances to the Final Round):
Pool B:  2–3 
Standings: Russia 26 points (9 matches),  13 (8), Germany 9 (9),  3 (8).
Pool C:  3–2 
Standings: Argentina 22 points (8 matches),  13 (7), Finland 9 (8),  7 (7).

June 22, 2011 (Wednesday)

Basketball
EuroBasket Women in Poland (teams in bold advance to the quarter-finals):
Group F in Katowice:
 60–81 
 53–62 
 79–55 
Standings (after 3 matches): Montenegro, Latvia 6 points, France 5, Spain 4, Croatia, Poland 3.

Cricket
ICC Intercontinental Cup, round 1:
In Aberdeen, day 2:  vs. ; No play due to rain.
India in the West Indies:
1st Test in Kingston, Jamaica, day 3:  246 & 252 (94.5 overs; Rahul Dravid 112);  173 & 131/3 (33 overs). West Indies require another 195 runs with 7 wickets remaining.

Football (soccer)
CONCACAF Gold Cup in the United States:
Semifinals in Houston:
 1–0 
 0–2 (a.e.t.) 
UEFA European Under-21 Championship in Denmark:
Semifinals: (winners qualify for 2012 Olympic tournament)
 3–1 (a.e.t.)  in Viborg
 1–0 (a.e.t.)  in Herning
FIFA U-17 World Cup in Mexico (team in bold advances to the knockout stage):
Group C in Pachuca:
 1–0 
 2–2 
Standings (after 2 matches): Uruguay 6 points, England 4, Canada 1, Rwanda 0.
Group D in Torreón:
 1–2 
 1–0 
Standings (after 2 matches): New Zealand, United States, Uzbekistan, Czech Republic 3 points.
Copa Libertadores Finals, second leg (first leg score in parentheses):
Santos  2–1 (0–0)  Peñarol. Santos win 4–1 on points.
Santos win the title for the third time, and their first since 1963.

Rugby union
IRB Junior World Championship in Italy:
9–12th place play-offs in Rovigo:
 30–11 
 12–8 
5–8th place play-offs in Padua:
 20–34 
 57–15 
Semifinals in Treviso:
 33–18 
 37–7

Snooker
Players Tour Championship:
Event 1 in Sheffield, England:
Final: Joe Perry  0–4 Ronnie O'Sullivan 
O'Sullivan wins the 46th professional title of his career.

Tennis
Grand Slams:
Wimbledon Championships in London, England, day 3:
Men's singles second round:
Rafael Nadal  [1] def. Ryan Sweeting  6–3, 6–2, 6–4
Andy Murray  [4] def. Tobias Kamke  6–3, 6–3, 7–5
Tomáš Berdych  [6] def. Julien Benneteau  6–1, 6–4, 6–2
Andy Roddick  [8] def. Victor Hănescu  6–4, 6–3, 6–4
Gaël Monfils  [9] def. Grega Žemlja  4–6, 6–3, 6–3, 7–6(7)
Mardy Fish  [10] def. Denis Istomin  7–6(4), 6–4, 6–4
Women's Singles Second Round:
Vera Zvonareva  [2] def. Elena Vesnina  6–1, 7–6(5)
Victoria Azarenka  [4] def. Iveta Benešová  6–0, 6–3
Petra Kvitová  [8] def. Anne Keothavong  6–2, 6–1

June 21, 2011 (Tuesday)

Cricket
ICC Intercontinental Cup, round 1:
In Aberdeen, day 1:  vs. ; No play due to rain.
India in the West Indies:
1st Test in Kingston, Jamaica, day 2:  246 & 91/3 (41 overs);  173 (67.5 overs). India lead by 164 runs with 7 wickets remaining.

Football (soccer)
FIFA U-17 World Cup in Mexico (team in bold advances to the knockout stage):
Group A in Morelia:
 1–1 
 2–1 
Standings (after 2 matches): Mexico 6 points, Congo 3, Netherlands, North Korea 1.
Group B in Monterrey:
 1–1 
 1–2 
Standings (after 2 matches): France, Japan 4 points, Argentina 3, Jamaica 0.
Friendly women's internationals (top 10 in FIFA Women's World Rankings):
(5)  1–1 (1)

Ice hockey
NHL news: The NHL Board of Governors unanimously approve the move of the Atlanta Thrashers to Winnipeg.

Tennis
Grand Slams:
Wimbledon Championships in London, England, day 2:
Men's singles first round:
Novak Djokovic  [2] def. Jérémy Chardy  6–4, 6–1, 6–1
Roger Federer  [3] def. Mikhail Kukushkin  7–6(2), 6–4, 6–2
Robin Söderling  [5] def. Philipp Petzschner  6–4, 6–4, 2–6, 7–6(5)
David Ferrer  [7] def. Benoît Paire  6–4, 6–4, 6–4
Andy Roddick  [8] def. Andreas Beck  6–4, 7–6(6), 6–3
Women's singles first round:
Caroline Wozniacki  [1] def. Arantxa Parra Santonja  6–2, 6–1
Li Na  [3] def. Alla Kudryavtseva  6–3, 6–3
Victoria Azarenka  [4] def. Magdaléna Rybáriková  6–4, 3–2 retired
Maria Sharapova  [5] def. Anna Chakvetadze  6–2, 6–1
Serena Williams  [7] def. Aravane Rezaï  6–3, 3–6, 6–1
Petra Kvitová  [8] def. Alexa Glatch  6–2, 6–2
Marion Bartoli  [9] def. Kristýna Plíšková  6–0, 6–2
Melinda Czink  def. Samantha Stosur  [10] 6–3, 6–4

June 20, 2011 (Monday)

Basketball
EuroBasket Women in Poland (teams in bold advance to the Main Round):
Group A in Bydgoszcz:
 57–46 
 65–80 
Final standings: Lithuania 6 points, Russia 5, Turkey 4, Slovak Republic 3.
Group B in Bydgoszcz:
 74–51 
 67–62 
Final standings: Czech Republic 6 points, Belarus 5, Great Britain 4, Israel 3.
Group C in Katowice:
 64–76 
 63–78 
Final standings: Montenegro 6 points, Spain 5, Poland 4, Germany 3.
Group D in Katowice:
 61–67 
 55–64 
Final standings: Latvia, France 5 points, Croatia, Greece 3.

Cricket
Sri Lanka in England:
3rd Test in Southampton, day 5:  184 & 334/5 (104 overs; Kumar Sangakkara 119);  377/8d. Match drawn; England win 3-match series 1–0.
India in the West Indies:
1st Test in Kingston, Jamaica, day 1:  246 (61.2 overs);  34/1 (20 overs). West Indies trail by 212 runs with 9 wickets remaining in the 1st innings.

Football (soccer)
Friendly international (top 10 in FIFA World Rankings):
(5)  4–0 
FIFA U-17 World Cup in Mexico:
Group E in Querétaro:
 6–1 
 0–1 
Group F in Guadalajara:
 3–0 
 2–1

Tennis
Grand Slams:
Wimbledon Championships in London, England, day 1:
Men's singles first round:
Rafael Nadal  [1] def. Michael Russell  6–4, 6–2, 6–2
Andy Murray  [4] def. Daniel Gimeno Traver  4–6, 6–3, 6–0, 6–0
Tomáš Berdych  [6] def. Filippo Volandri  6–2, 6–2, 6–1
Gaël Monfils  [9] def. Matthias Bachinger  6–4, 7–6(3), 6–3
Mardy Fish  [10] def. Marcel Granollers  7–6(3), 7–6(5), 6–4
Women's singles first round:
Vera Zvonareva  [2] def. Alison Riske  6–0, 3–6, 6–3
Victoria Azarenka  [4] vs. Magdaléna Rybáriková  6–4, 3–2 (match suspended)
Francesca Schiavone  [6] def. Jelena Dokić  6–4, 1–6, 6–3

June 19, 2011 (Sunday)

Athletics
European Team Championships Super League in Stockholm, Sweden:
Men:
Hammer: Markus Esser  79.28m
110m hurdles: Andy Turner  13.42
Pole vault: Maksym Mazuryk  5.72m
800m: Adam Kszczot  1:46.50
Discus: Robert Harting  65.63m
3000m: Juan Carlos Higuero  8:03.43
Triple jump: Fabrizio Schembri  16.95m
200m: Christophe Lemaitre  20.28
3000m steeplechase: Vincent Zouaoui-Dandrieux  8:30.85
4 × 400 m:  (Maksim Dyldin, Dmitry Buryak, Pavel Trenikhin, Denis Alekseyev) 3:02.42
Women:
Shot put: Nadine Kleinert  17.81m
Long jump: Darya Klishina  6.74m
200m: Mariya Ryemyen  23.10
High jump: Emma Green  1.89m
100m hurdles: Tatyana Dektyareva  13.16
1500m: Charlene Thomas  4:06.85
Discus: Kateryna Karsak  63.35m
5000m: Dolores Checa  15:16.89
4 × 400 m:  (Kseniya Vdovina, Ksenia Zadorina, Tatyana Firova, Lyudmila Litvinova) 3:27.17
Final standings: (1) Russia 385 points (2) Germany 331.5 (3) Ukraine 304
Russia win the title for the second successive time.

Auto racing
Sprint Cup Series:
Heluva Good! Sour Cream Dips 400 in Brooklyn, Michigan: (1)  Denny Hamlin (Toyota; Joe Gibbs Racing) (2)  Matt Kenseth (Ford; Roush Fenway Racing) (3)  Kyle Busch (Toyota; Joe Gibbs Racing)
Drivers' championship standings (after 15 of 36 races): (1)  Carl Edwards (Ford; Roush Fenway Racing) 532 points (2)  Kevin Harvick (Chevrolet; Richard Childress Racing) 512 (3)  Dale Earnhardt Jr. (Chevrolet; Hendrick Motorsports) 505
IndyCar Series:
Milwaukee 225 in West Allis, Wisconsin: (1) Dario Franchitti  (Chip Ganassi Racing) (2) Graham Rahal  (Chip Ganassi Racing) (3) Oriol Servià  (Newman/Haas Racing)
Franchitti's 29th victory in American open-wheel racing moves him into a tie for ninth on the all-time list, with Rick Mears.
Drivers' championship standings (after 8 of 18 races): (1) Will Power  (Team Penske) & Franchitti 271 points (3) Servià 198
V8 Supercars:
Skycity Triple Crown in Darwin, Northern Territory:
Race 13: (1) Shane van Gisbergen  (Stone Brothers Racing, Ford FG Falcon) (2) Craig Lowndes  (Triple Eight Race Engineering, Holden VE Commodore) (3) Mark Winterbottom  (Ford Performance Racing, Ford FG Falcon)
Drivers' championship standings (after 13 of 28 races): (1) Jamie Whincup  (Triple Eight Race Engineering, Holden VE Commodore) 1395 points (2) Lowndes 1239 (3) Van Gisbergen 1134
World Rally Championship:
Acropolis Rally of Greece in Loutraki, Greece: (1) Sébastien Ogier /Julien Ingrassia  (Citroën DS3 WRC) (2) Sébastien Loeb /Daniel Elena  (Citroën DS3 WRC) (3) Mikko Hirvonen /Jarmo Lehtinen  (Ford Fiesta RS WRC)
Drivers' championship standings (after 7 of 13 rallies): (1) Loeb 146 points (2) Hirvonen 129 (3) Ogier 124
World Touring Car Championship:
Race of the Czech Republic in Brno:
Race 1: (1) Rob Huff  (Chevrolet; Chevrolet Cruze) (2) Yvan Muller  (Chevrolet; Chevrolet Cruze) (3) Alain Menu  (Chevrolet; Chevrolet Cruze)
Race 2: (1) Muller (2) Tom Coronel  (ROAL Motorsport; BMW 320 TC) (3) Menu
Drivers' championship standings (after 5 of 12 rounds): (1) Huff 187 points (2) Muller 162 (3) Menu 134

Badminton
BWF Super Series:
Singapore Super Series in Singapore:
Men's singles: Chen Jin  def. Lin Dan  walkover
Women's singles: Wang Xin  def. Tine Baun  21–19, 21–17
Men's doubles: Cai Yun /Fu Haifeng  def. Alvent Yulianto Chandra /Hendra Aprida Gunawan  21–17, 21–13
Women's doubles: Tian Qing /Zhao Yunlei  def. Ha Jung-eun /Kim Min-jung  21–13, 21–16
Mixed doubles: Tontowi Ahmad /Liliyana Natsir  def. Chen Hung-ling /Cheng Wen-hsing  21–14, 27–25

Basketball
EuroBasket Women in Poland (teams in bold advance to the Main Round):
Group A in Bydgoszcz:
 60–76 
 76–64 
Standings (after 2 games): Lithuania 4 points, Turkey, Russia 3, Slovak Republic 2.
Group B in Bydgoszcz:
 41–68 
 45–60 
Standings (after 2 games): Belarus, Czech Republic 4 points, Great Britain, Israel 2.
Group C in Katowice:
 66–57 
 60–75 
Standings (after 2 games): Montenegro 4 points, Spain, Poland 3, Germany 2.
Group D in Katowice:
 65–63 
 59–56 (OT) 
Standings (after 2 games): France, Greece, Latvia, Croatia 3 points.
 Lega Basket Serie A Finals, Game 5: Montepaschi Siena 63–61 Bennet Cantù. Montepaschi Siena win best-of-7 series 4–1.
Montepaschi Siena win the championship for the fifth successive time and sixth time overall.

Beach volleyball
World Championships in Rome, Italy:
Men's:
Bronze medal Match: Pļaviņš–Šmēdiņš  1–2  Brink–Reckermann 
Gold medal Match:  Araújo–Ricardo  0–2  Emanuel–Alison 
Emanuel wins his third title after a break of 8 years, while Alison wins for the first time.
Women's:
Bronze medal Match:  Xue–Zhang  2–0 Klapalová–Hajecková 
Gold medal Match:  May-Treanor–Walsh  1–2  Larissa–Juliana 
Larissa and Juliana defeat 3-times winners May-Treanor and Walsh to win their first title.

Canoeing
Sprint European Championships in Belgrade, Serbia:
Men:
C-1 500m: Valentyn Demyanenko  1:50.681  Paweł Baraszkiewicz  1:50.693  Dzianis Harazha  1:50.939
K-1 500m: Yury Postrigay  1:39.418  Anders Gustafsson  1:39.532  Kasper Bleibach  1:39.550
C-2 500m:  (Alexandru Dumitrescu, Victor Mihalachi) 1:41.641   (Sergiy Bezugliy, Maksym Prokopenko) 1:41.689   (Roman Rynkiewicz, Mariusz Kruk) 1:41.959
K-2 500m:  (Raman Piatrushenka, Vadzim Makhneu) 1:30.355   (Erik Vlček, Peter Gelle) 1:30.601   (Emanuel Silva, João Ribeiro) 1:30.739
K-1 200m: Piotr Siemionowski  35.418  Péter Molnár  35.460  Ed McKeever  35.538
C-1 200m: Demyanenko  39.855  Alfonso Benavides López de Ayala  40.047  Yuriy Cheban  40.161
K-2 200m:  (Liam Heath, Jon Schofield) 32.487   (Piatrushenka, Makhneu) 32.775   (Anders Svensson, Christian Svanqvist) 32.793
C-2 200m:  (Raimundas Labuckas, Tomas Gadeikis) 37.416   (Aleksandr Vauchetskiy, Dzmitry Rabchanka) 37.866   (Attila Bozsik, Gábor Horváth) 37.914
C-1 5000m: Sebastian Brendel  24:07.383  José Luis Bouza  24:15.819  Lukáš Koranda  24:28.725
K-1 5000m: Aleh Yurenia  20:45.612  Eirik Verås Larsen  20:45.966  René Holten Poulsen  21:04.908
Women:
C-2 500m:  (Katsiaryna Herasimenka, Svitlana Tulupava) 2:14.554   (Kincso Takacs, Dorina Obermayer) 2:14.554   (Vetra Bardak, Anastasia Ganina) 2:14.554
K-1 500m: Danuta Kozák  1:51.552  Inna Osypenko-Radomska  1:53.154  Ewelina Wojnarowska  1:54.204
K-2 500m:  (Tamara Csipes, Katalin Kovács) 1:40.207   (Aneta Konieczna, Beata Mikołajczyk) 1:40.339   (Yuliana Salakhova, Anastasia Sergeeva) 1:41.671
K-4 500m:   (Iryna Pamialova, Nadzeya Papok, Volha Khudzenka, Maryna Paltaran) 1:33.088   (Dalma Benedek, Kozák, Anna Karasz, Gabriella Szabó) 1:34.006   (Tina Dietze, Carolin Leonhardt, Silke Hoermann, Franziska Weber) 1:34.834
C-1 200m: Maria Kazakova  50.455  Lydia Weber  52.999  Herasimenka  53.275
K-1 200m: Natalia Lobova  40.120  Maria Teresa Portela  40.282  Teresa Portela  40.300
K-2 200m:  (Kozák, Kovács) 37.820   (Dietze, Weber) 38.036   (Paltaran, Khudzenka) 38.300
K-1 5000m: Paltaran  23:12.661  Lani Belcher  23:21.415  Ludmila Galushko  23:28.315

Cricket
Sri Lanka in England:
3rd Test in Southampton, day 4:  184 & 112/3 (49 overs);  377/8d (92.4 overs; Ian Bell 119*). Sri Lanka trail by 81 runs with 7 wickets remaining.

Cycling
UCI World Tour:
Tour de Suisse, Stage 9:  Fabian Cancellara  41' 01"  Andreas Klöden  + 9"  Levi Leipheimer  + 13"
Final general classification: (1) Leipheimer  31h 45' 02" (2) Damiano Cunego  + 4" (3) Steven Kruijswijk  + 1' 02"
UCI World Tour standings (after 16 of 27 races): (1) Philippe Gilbert  356 points (2) Alberto Contador  349 (3) Michele Scarponi  348

Equestrianism
Eventing – Luhmühlen Horse Trials (CCI 4*) in Salzhausen:  Andreas Dibowski  on Butts Leon  Sandra Auffarth  on Opgun Louvo  Frank Ostholt  on Little Paint

Football (soccer)
CONCACAF Gold Cup in the United States:
Quarterfinals in Washington, D.C.:
 0–2 
 1–1 (5–3 pen.) 
UEFA European Under-21 Championship in Denmark (teams in bold advance to the semifinals):
Group B:
 1–2  in Viborg
 0–3  in Herning
Final standings: Spain 7 points, Czech Republic 6, England 2, Ukraine 1.
FIFA U-17 World Cup in Mexico:
Group C in Pachuca:
 0–2 
 3–0 
Group D in Torreón:
 1–4 
 3–0 
Friendly women's internationals (top 10 in FIFA Women's World Rankings):
(5)  0–4 (1) 
CAF Confederation Cup Play-off for group stage, second leg (first leg score in parentheses):
Motema Pembe  2–0 (0–1)  Simba. Motema Pembe win 2–1 on aggregate.

Golf
Men's majors:
U.S. Open in Bethesda, Maryland, United States:
Leaderboard after final round: (1) Rory McIlroy  268 (−16) (2) Jason Day  276 (−8) (T3) Kevin Chappell , Robert Garrigus , Lee Westwood  & Y. E. Yang  278 (−6)
McIlroy wins his first major, setting records for the lowest 72-hole score both in absolute terms and in relation to par at the U.S. Open. He becomes the third Northern Irish player to win a major after Fred Daly at the 1947 Open Championship and Graeme McDowell at the 2010 U.S. Open.
European Tour:
Saint-Omer Open in Saint-Omer, France:
Winner: Matthew Zions  276 (−8)
Zions wins his first European Tour title.

Motorcycle racing
Superbike:
Aragon World Championship round in Alcañiz, Spain:
Race 1: (1) Marco Melandri  (Yamaha YZF-R1) (2) Max Biaggi  (Aprilia RSV4) (3) Leon Camier  (Aprilia RSV4)
Race 2: (1) Biaggi (2) Melandri (3) Carlos Checa  (Ducati 1198)
Riders' championship standings (after 7 of 13 rounds): (1) Checa 261 points (2) Biaggi 218 (3) Melandri 195
Supersport:
Aragon World Championship round in Alcañiz, Spain: (1) Chaz Davies  (Yamaha YZF-R6) (2) Sam Lowes  (Honda CBR600RR) (3) David Salom  (Kawasaki Ninja ZX-6R)
Riders' championship standings (after 6 of 12 rounds): (1) Davies 105 points (2) Broc Parkes  (Kawasaki Ninja ZX-6R) 85 (3) Salom 71

Triathlon
ITU World Championships, Leg 3 in Kitzbühel, Austria:
Men:  Alistair Brownlee  1:51:54  Alexander Brukhankov  1:52:38  Sven Riederer  1:52:59
Standings (after 3 of 6 legs): (1) Alistair Brownlee 1690 points (2) Brukhankov 1663 (3) Javier Gómez  1485
Women:  Paula Findlay  2:05:52  Helen Jenkins  2:05:56  Sarah Groff  2:06:27
Standings (after 3 of 6 legs): (1) Findlay 2400 points (2) Barbara Riveros Diaz  1912 (3) Andrea Hewitt  1685

Volleyball
FIVB World League, Week 4 (team in bold advances to the final round):
Pool A:  3–0 
Standings (after 8 matches): Brazil 21 points,  15,  12, Puerto Rico 0.
Pool B:
 3–0 
 1–3 
Standings (after 8 matches): Russia 24 points, Bulgaria 13, Germany 8, Japan 3.
Pool C:  3–0 
Standings (after 8 matches): Argentina 20 points,  13,  8, Portugal 7.
Pool D:  0–3 
Standings (after 8 matches):  19 points, Cuba 15, South Korea 10,  4.
Men's European League, Leg 4:
Pool A:
 0–3 
 3–2 
Standings (after 8 matches): Slovenia 20 points, Belgium 12, Great Britain, Croatia 8.
Pool B:  3–1 
Standings (after 8 matches):  21 points, Netherlands 17,  7, Austria 3.
Pool C:  3–1 
Standings (after 8 matches):  18 points, Slovakia 15, Belarus 10,  5.
Women's European League, Leg 4:
Pool C:  1–3 
Standings (after 8 matches):  21 points,  14, Belarus 12, Croatia 1.

June 18, 2011 (Saturday)

Athletics
European Team Championships Super League in Stockholm, Sweden:
Men:
400m hurdles: David Greene  49.21
Shot put: David Storl  20.81m
Long jump: Aleksandr Menkov  8.20m
400m: Maksim Dyldin  45.82
High jump: Dmytro Dem'yanyuk  2.35m
100m: Christophe Lemaitre  9.95
1500m: Manuel Olmedo  3:38.63
Javelin: Dmytro Kosynskyy  81.29m
5000m: Jesús España  13:39.25
4 × 100 m:  (Christian Malcolm, Craig Pickering, James Ellington, Harry Aikines-Aryeetey) 38.60
Women:
Hammer: Betty Heidler  73.43m
Pole vault: Anna Rogowska  4.75m
100m: Véronique Mang  11.23
Javelin: Christina Obergföll  66.22m
800m: Mariya Savinova  1:58.75
3000m: Olesya Syreva  8:53.20
400m hurdles: Zuzana Hejnová  53.87
Triple jump: Olha Saladukha  14.85m
3000m steeplechase: Gulnara Samitova-Galkina  9:31.20
400m: Antonina Yefremova  51.02
4 × 100 m:  (Olesya Povh, Nataliya Pohrebnyak, Mariya Ryemyen, Hrystyna Stuy) 42.85
Standings after day 1: (1) Russia 213 points (2) Germany 183.5 (3) Great Britain 166.

Auto racing
Nationwide Series:
Alliance Truck Parts 250 in Brooklyn, Michigan: (1)  Carl Edwards (Ford; Roush Fenway Racing) (2)  Ricky Stenhouse Jr. (Ford; Roush Fenway Racing) (3)  Kyle Busch (Toyota; Joe Gibbs Racing)
Drivers' championship standings (after 15 of 34 races): (1) Stenhouse Jr. 525 points (2)  Elliott Sadler (Chevrolet; Kevin Harvick Incorporated) 523 (3)  Reed Sorenson (Chevrolet; Turner Motorsports) 521
V8 Supercars:
Skycity Triple Crown in Darwin, Northern Territory:
Race 12: (1) Rick Kelly  (Kelly Racing, Holden VE Commodore) (2) Steven Johnson  (Dick Johnson Racing, Ford FG Falcon) (3) Craig Lowndes  (Triple Eight Race Engineering, Holden VE Commodore)
Drivers' championship standings (after 12 of 28 races): (1) Jamie Whincup  (Triple Eight Race Engineering, Holden VE Commodore) 1293 points (2) Lowndes 1101 (3) Kelly 1037

Basketball
EuroBasket Women in Poland:
Group A in Bydgoszcz:
 58–64 
 68–66 
Group B in Bydgoszcz:
 55–40 
 72–56 
Group C in Katowice:
 79–69 
 53–70 
Group D in Katowice:
 67–57 
 86–40 
 Bundesliga Finals, Game 5: Brose Baskets 72–65 Alba Berlin. Brose Baskets win best-of-5 series 3–2.
Brose Baskets win the championship for the second successive time and fourth time overall.

Canoeing
Sprint European Championships in Belgrade, Serbia:
Men:
K-1 1000 m:  Max Hoff  3:22.485  Aleh Yurenia  3:25.029  Fernando Pimenta  3:25.881
C-1 1000 m:  Sebastian Brendel  3:47.155  Josif Chirilă  3:49.645  José Luis Bouza  3:50.065
K-2 1000 m:   (Andreas Ihle, Martin Hollstein) 3:07.095   (Vitaly Yurchenko, Vasily Pogreban) 3:07.827   (Roland Kökény, Rudolf Dombi) 3:08.205
C-2 1000 m:   (Alexey Korovashkov, Ilya Pervukhin) 3:28.584   (Andrei Bahdanovich, Aliaksandr Bahdanovich) 3:28.614   (Victor Mihalachi, Liviu Alexandru Dumitrescu Lazăr) 3:28.818
K-4 1000 m:   (Pimenta, João Ribeiro, Emanuel Silva, David Fernandes) 2:49.618   (Hoff, Marcus Gross, Norman Bröckl, Robert Gleinert) 2:49.960   (Ionel Gavrila, Ştefan Vasile, Toni Ioneticu, Traian Neagu) 2:50.056
C-4 1000 m:   (Márton Tóth, Mátyás Sáfrán, Mihaly Sáfrán, Róbert Mike) 3:16.042   (Andrei Bahdanovich, Dzmitry Rabchanka, Aliaksandr Bahdanovich, Aleksandr Vauchetskiy) 3:16.270   (Ivan Kuznetsov, Rasul Ishmukhamedov, Kirill Shamshurin, Vladimir Chernyshkov) 3:16.528
Women:
K-1 1000 m:  Katalin Kovács  3:55.232  Antonija Nadj  3:57.716  Edyta Dzieniszewska  4:02.732
K-2 1000 m:   (Tamara Csipes, Gabriella Szabó) 3:31.741   (Franziska Weber, Tina Dietze) 3:32.629   (Anastasia Sergeeva, Yuliana Salakhova) 3:34.927

Cricket
Sri Lanka in England:
3rd Test in Southampton, day 3:  184 (64.2 overs; Chris Tremlett 6/48);  195/4 (48 overs). England lead by 11 runs with 6 wickets remaining in the 1st innings.

Cycling
UCI World Tour:
Tour de Suisse, Stage 8:  Peter Sagan   3h 52' 00"  Matthew Goss  s.t.  Ben Swift  s.t.
General classification (after stage 8): (1) Damiano Cunego   31h 01' 49" (2) Steven Kruijswijk  + 1' 36" (3) Fränk Schleck  + 1' 41"

Equestrianism
FEI Nations Cup Show Jumping – Promotional League, Europe:
FEI Nations Cup of Norway in Drammen (CSIO 3*):   (Arthur Gustavo da Silva, Niklaus Schurtenberger, Claudia Gisler, Christina Liebherr)   (Gerry Flynn, Çağrı Başel, Omer Karaevli, Burak Azak)   (Msciwoj Kiecon, Piotr Sawicki, Antoni Tomaszewski)
Standings (after 4 of 6 events): (1)  40.5 points (2)  35 (3)  32.5

Football (soccer)
CONCACAF Gold Cup in the United States:
Quarterfinals in East Rutherford:
 1–1 (2–4 pen.) 
 2–1 
Friendly women's internationals (top 10 in FIFA Women's World Rankings):
(4)  1–1 
(7)  7–0 
UEFA European Under-21 Championship in Denmark (teams in bold advance to the semifinals):
Group A:
 3–1  in Aalborg
 3–0  in Aarhus
Final standings: Switzerland 9 points, Belarus, Iceland, Denmark 3.
FIFA U-17 World Cup in Mexico:
Group A in Morelia:
 3–1 
 1–0 
Group B in Monterrey:
 3–0 
 1–0 
 Categoría Primera A Campeonato Apertura Finals, second leg (first leg score in parentheses):
Atlético Nacional 2–1 (1–2) La Equidad. 3–3 on aggregate; Atlético Nacional win 3–2 on penalties.
Atlético win the title for the eleventh time.

Golf
Men's majors:
U.S. Open in Bethesda, Maryland, United States:
Leaderboard after third round: (1) Rory McIlroy  199 (−14) (2) Y. E. Yang  207 (−6) (T3) Jason Day , Robert Garrigus  & Lee Westwood  208 (−5)
The Amateur Championship in Southport, England:
Final: Bryden Macpherson  def. Michael Stewart  3 & 2
Macpherson becomes the second Australian to win the title, after Doug Bachli in 1954.

Mixed martial arts
Strikeforce: Overeem vs. Werdum in Dallas, Texas, United States:
Heavyweight Grand Prix Quarterfinal bout: Alistair Overeem  def. Fabrício Werdum  via unanimous decision
Heavyweight Grand Prix Quarterfinal bout: Josh Barnett  def. Brett Rogers  via submission (arm triangle choke)
Lightweight bout: Jorge Masvidal  def. K. J. Noons  via unanimous decision
Heavyweight bout: Daniel Cormier  def. Jeff Monson  via unanimous decision
Heavyweight bout: Chad Griggs  def. Valentijn Overeem  via submission (strikes)

Rugby union
IRB Junior World Championship in Italy (teams in bold advance to the semi-finals):
Pool A:
 6–56  in Treviso
 15–48  in Padua
Final standings: New Zealand 15 points, Wales 10, Argentina 4, Italy 0.
Pool B:
 36–18  in Rovigo
 25–31  in Treviso
Final standings: France 14 points, Australia 11, Fiji 5, Tonga 0.
Pool C:
 26–20  in Padua
 30–13  in Rovigo
Final standings: England 14 points, South Africa 11, Ireland 4, Scotland 0.

Tennis
ATP World Tour:
UNICEF Open in 's-Hertogenbosch, Netherlands:
Final: Dmitry Tursunov  def. Ivan Dodig  6–3, 6–2
Tursunov wins the seventh title of his career.
Aegon International in Eastbourne, United Kingdom:
Final: Andreas Seppi  def. Janko Tipsarević  7–6(7–5), 3–6, 5–3 retired
Seppi wins the first title of his career.
WTA Tour:
UNICEF Open in 's-Hertogenbosch, Netherlands:
Final: Roberta Vinci  def. Jelena Dokić  6–7(7–9), 6–3, 7–5
Vinci wins the fifth title of her career and second of the year.
Aegon International in Eastbourne, United Kingdom:
Final: Marion Bartoli  def. Petra Kvitová  6–1, 4–6, 7–5
Bartoli wins the sixth title of her career, and her second Premier-level title.

Volleyball
FIVB World League, Week 4 (team in bold advances to the final round):
Pool A:
 3–0 
 3–1 
Standings: Brazil 18 points (7 matches), United States 15 (8), Poland 12 (8), Puerto Rico 0 (7).
Pool B:
 3–0 
 3–2 
Standings (after 7 matches): Russia 21 points, Bulgaria 10, Germany 8, Japan 3.
Pool C:
 3–2 
 3–1 
Standings: Argentina 17 points (7 matches), Serbia 13 (8), Finland 8 (8), Portugal 7 (7).
Pool D:
 0–3 
 3–1 
Standings: Italy 19 points (8 matches), Cuba 12 (7), South Korea 10 (7), France 4 (8).
Men's European League, Leg 4:
Pool A:
 3–1 
 3–2 
Standings (after 7 matches): Slovenia 20 points, Belgium 10, Croatia 7, Great Britain 5.
Pool B:
 1–3 
 3–0 
Standings: Spain 21 points (8 matches), Netherlands 17 (7), Greece 7 (8), Austria 0 (7).
Pool C:
 3–0 
 0–3 
Standings: Romania 18 points (8 matches), Slovakia 15 (7), Belarus 7 (7), Turkey 5 (8).
Women's European League, Leg 4:
Pool A:
 3–0 
 1–3 
Standings (after 8 matches): Serbia 23 points, Spain 13, France 10, Greece 2.
Pool B:
 2–3 
 0–3 
Standings (after 8 matches): Bulgaria 20 points, Czech Republic 18, Hungary 6, Israel 4.
Pool C:
 0–3 
 2–3 
Standings: Turkey 21 points (8 matches), Romania 14 (8), Belarus 9 (7), Croatia 1 (7).
Men's Pan-American Cup in Gatineau, Canada:
Classification 7–8:  3–1 
Classification 5–6:  0–3 
Classification 3–4:   3–0 
Final:   3–1  
Brazil win the Cup for the first time.

June 17, 2011 (Friday)

Basketball
 Turkish League Finals, Game 4: Galatasaray 88–91 Fenerbahçe Ülker. Fenerbahçe Ülker win best-of-7 series 4–2.
Fenerbahçe Ülker win the title for the fourth time in five years, and fifth time overall.

Cricket
Sri Lanka in England:
3rd Test in Southampton, day 2:  177/9 (61.2 overs; Chris Tremlett 6/42); .

Cycling
UCI World Tour:
Tour de Suisse, Stage 7:  Thomas De Gendt  5h 38' 42"  Andy Schleck  + 35"  José Joaquín Rojas  + 48"
General classification (after stage 7): (1) Damiano Cunego   27h 09' 49" (2) Bauke Mollema  + 1' 23" (3) Steven Kruijswijk  + 1' 36"

Football (soccer)
Friendly women's internationals (top 10 in FIFA Women's World Rankings):
(1)  2–3 (9)

Golf
Men's majors:
U.S. Open in Bethesda, Maryland, United States:
Leaderboard after second day (USA unless stated): (1) Rory McIlroy  131 (−11) (2) Y. E. Yang  137 (−5) (T3) Sergio García , Robert Garrigus, Zach Johnson, Matt Kuchar & Brandt Snedeker 140 (−2)
21 players will complete their second rounds on June 18, due to rain and electrical disturbances.

Volleyball
FIVB World League, Week 4 (team in bold advances to the final round):
Pool A:  0–3 
Standings:  15 points (6 matches), Poland, United States 12 (7),  0 (6).
Pool C:  2–3 
Standings:  14 points (6 matches), Serbia 12 (7),  7 (6), Finland 6 (7).
Pool D:  1–3 
Standings: Italy 16 points (7 matches),  10 (6),  9 (6), France 4 (7).
Men's European League, Leg 4:
Pool B:  3–0 
Standings: Spain 18 points (7 matches),  14 (6), Greece 7 (7),  0 (6).
Pool C:  3–0 
Standings: Romania 15 points (7 matches),  12 (6),  7 (6), Turkey 5 (7).
Women's European League, Leg 4:
Pool A:
 3–0 
 0–3 
Standings (after 7 matches): Serbia 20 points, France, Spain 10, Greece 2.
Pool B:
 1–3 
 0–3 
Standings (after 7 matches): Bulgaria 17 points, Czech Republic 16, Hungary 5, Israel 4.
Pool C:  3–1 
Standings: Turkey 18 points (7 matches), Romania 14 (7),  7 (6),  0 (6).
Men's Pan-American Cup in Gatineau, Canada:
Classification 9–10:  1–3 
Classification 5–8:
 1–3 
 3–0 
Semifinals:
 3–0 
 3–0

June 16, 2011 (Thursday)

Basketball
 Russian Professional League Finals, Game 4: Khimki Moscow 63–74 CSKA Moscow. CSKA Moscow win best-of-5 series 3–1.
CSKA Moscow win the Russian championship for the eighth successive time and the 18th time in 20 years.

Cricket
Sri Lanka in England:
3rd Test in Southampton, day 1:  81/4 (38 overs); .
India in the West Indies:
5th ODI in Kingston, Jamaica:  251 (47.3 overs);  255/3 (48.4 overs). West Indies win by 7 wickets; India win 5-match series 3–2.

Cycling
UCI World Tour:
Tour de Suisse, Stage 6:  Steven Kruijswijk  4h 12' 03"  Levi Leipheimer  + 9"  Damiano Cunego   + 18"
General classification (after stage 6): (1) Cunego  21h 26' 28" (2) Bauke Mollema  + 1' 23" (3) Kruijswijk + 1' 36"

Football (soccer)
Friendly women's internationals (top 10 in FIFA Women's World Rankings):
(2)  3–0 (9) 
(3)  –  — cancelled due to air travel disruption caused by the Puyehue eruption.
(5)  2–0

Golf
Men's majors:
U.S. Open in Bethesda, Maryland, United States:
Leaderboard after first round: (1) Rory McIlroy  65 (−6) (T2) Charl Schwartzel  & Y. E. Yang  68 (−3)

Volleyball
Men's Pan-American Cup in Gatineau, Canada:
Classification 5–10:
 0–3 
 3–2 
Quarterfinals:
 1–3 
 3–1

June 15, 2011 (Wednesday)

Cycling
UCI World Tour:
Tour de Suisse, Stage 5:  Borut Božič  4h 44' 48"  Óscar Freire  s.t.  Peter Sagan   s.t.
General classification (after stage 5): (1) Damiano Cunego   17h 14' 11" (2) Mauricio Soler  + 54" (3) Bauke Mollema  + 1' 16"

Football (soccer)
2014 FIFA World Cup qualification (CONCACAF) First Round, first leg in Couva, Trinidad and Tobago:  2–5 
UEFA European Under-21 Championship in Denmark:
Group B:
 0–2  in Viborg
 0–0  in Herning
Standings (after 2 matches): Spain 4 points, Czech Republic 3, England 2, Ukraine 1.
Friendly women's internationals (top 10 in FIFA Women's World Rankings):
 1–2 (7) 
(5)  2–5 (9) 
Copa Libertadores Finals, first leg: Peñarol  0–0  Santos

Ice hockey
Stanley Cup Finals (best-of-7 series):
Game 7 in Vancouver: Boston Bruins 4, Vancouver Canucks 0. Bruins win series 4–3.
The Bruins win the championship for the sixth time, and their first since 1972, with goaltender Tim Thomas awarded the Conn Smythe Trophy as the MVP of the playoffs. Patrice Bergeron becomes a member of the Triple Gold Club, adding the Cup to his previous gold medals at the World Championships and Olympics.
With the Bruins victory, Boston becomes the first city to win championships in all four major professional leagues (NFL, NBA, MLB and NHL) in the 21st century.

Rugby league
State of Origin Series:
Game II in Sydney: New South Wales  18–8  Queensland. 3-match series tied 1–1.

Volleyball
Men's Pan-American Cup in Gatineau, Canada (teams in bold advance to the semifinals; teams in italics advance to quarterfinal playoffs):
Group A:  3–0 
Final standings: Brazil 6 points,  2, Venezuela 1.
Group B:  3–0 
Final standings: Canada 6 points,  3, Dominican Republic 0.
Group C:
 3–1 
 3–0 
Final standings: United States 9 points, Argentina 6, Panama 3, Bahamas 0.

June 14, 2011 (Tuesday)

Basketball
 ACB Playoffs Finals Game 3: Bilbao 55–64 Barcelona. Barcelona win best-of-5 series 3–0.
Barcelona win the title for the 16th time.

Cycling
UCI World Tour:
Tour de Suisse, Stage 4:  Thor Hushovd  4h 46' 05"  Peter Sagan   s.t.  Marco Marcato  + 2"
General classification (after stage 4): (1) Damiano Cunego   12h 29' 23" (2) Mauricio Soler  + 54" (3) Bauke Mollema  + 1' 16"

Football (soccer)
CONCACAF Gold Cup in the United States (teams in bold advance to the quarterfinals):
Group C in Kansas City:
 1–1 
 0–1 
Final standings: Panama 7 points, United States 6, Canada 4, Guadeloupe 0.
UEFA European Under-21 Championship in Denmark:
Group A:
 2–0  in Aalborg
 2–1  in Aarhus
Standings (after 2 matches): Switzerland 6 points, Denmark, Belarus 3, Iceland 0.
Friendly women's internationals (top 10 in FIFA Women's World Rankings):
(6)  2–0 (8)

Rugby union
IRB Junior World Championship in Italy:
Pool A in Rovigo:
 92–0 
 3–27 
Standings (after 2 matches): New Zealand 10 points, Wales 5, Argentina 4, Italy 0.
Pool B in Padua:
 50–25 
 27–14 
Standings (after 2 matches): Australia 10 points, France 9, Fiji, Tonga 0.
Pool C in Treviso:
 39–18 
 26–42 
Standings (after 2 matches): South Africa, England 10 points, Ireland, Scotland 0.

Volleyball
Men's Pan-American Cup in Gatineau, Canada:
Group A:  2–3 
Standings:  3 points (1 match), Mexico 2 (2), Venezuela 1 (1).
Group B:  1–3 
Standings:  3 points (1 match), Puerto Rico 3 (2), Dominican Republic 0 (1).
Group C:
 3–0 
 3–0 
Standings (after 2 matches): Argentina, United States 6 points, Bahamas, Panama 0.

June 13, 2011 (Monday)

Cricket
India in the West Indies:
4th ODI in North Sound, Antigua:  249/8 (50 overs);  146 (39 overs). West Indies win by 103 runs; India lead 5-match series 3–1.

Cycling
UCI World Tour:
Tour de Suisse, Stage 3:  Peter Sagan  3h 09' 47"  Damiano Cunego  s.t.  Jakob Fuglsang  + 21"
General classification (after stage 3): (1) Cunego  7h 43' 16" (2) Mauricio Soler  + 54" (3) Bauke Mollema  + 1' 16"

Football (soccer)
CONCACAF Gold Cup in the United States (teams in bold advance to the quarterfinals):
Group B in Harrison:
 4–0 
 0–1 
Final standings: Jamaica 9 points, Honduras, Guatemala 4, Grenada 0.

Ice hockey
Stanley Cup Finals (best-of-7 series):
Game 6 in Boston: Boston Bruins 5, Vancouver Canucks 2. Series tied 3–3.

Tennis
ATP World Tour:
Aegon Championships in London, United Kingdom:
Final: Andy Murray  def. Jo-Wilfried Tsonga  3–6, 7–6(2), 6–4
Murray wins the tournament for the second time after 2009, for his first title of the year and 17th of his career.
WTA Tour:
Aegon Classic in Birmingham, United Kingdom:
Final: Sabine Lisicki  def. Daniela Hantuchová  6–3, 6–2
Lisicki wins the second title of her career.

Volleyball
Men's Pan-American Cup in Gatineau, Canada:
Group A:  3–0 
Group B:  3–0 
Group C:
 3–0 
 3–0

June 12, 2011 (Sunday)

Auto racing
Formula One:
 in Montreal, Canada: (1) Jenson Button  (McLaren–Mercedes) (2) Sebastian Vettel  (Red Bull–Renault) (3) Mark Webber  (Red Bull-Renault)
Drivers' championship standings (after 7 of 19 races): (1) Vettel 161 points (2) Button 101 (3) Webber 94
Sprint Cup Series:
5-hour Energy 500 in Long Pond, Pennsylvania: (1)   Jeff Gordon (Chevrolet; Hendrick Motorsports) (2)  Kurt Busch (Dodge; Penske Racing) (3)  Kyle Busch (Toyota; Joe Gibbs Racing)
Gordon wins his 84th career Cup Series race, moving him into a tie with Darrell Waltrip for the most wins in NASCAR's modern era.
Drivers' championship standings (after 14 of 36 races): (1)  Carl Edwards (Ford; Roush Fenway Racing) 492 points (2)  Jimmie Johnson (Chevrolet; Hendrick Motorsports) 486 (3)  Dale Earnhardt Jr. (Chevrolet; Hendrick Motorsports) 482
Intercontinental Le Mans Cup:
24 Hours of Le Mans in Le Mans, France: (1)  #2 Audi Sport Team Joest (Marcel Fässler , André Lotterer , Benoît Tréluyer ) (2)  #9 Team Peugeot Total (Sébastien Bourdais , Simon Pagenaud , Pedro Lamy ) (3)  #8 Team Peugeot Total (Stéphane Sarrazin , Franck Montagny , Nicolas Minassian )

Basketball
 NBA Finals (best-of-7 series):
Game 6 in Miami: Dallas Mavericks 105, Miami Heat 95. Mavericks win series 4–2.
The Mavericks win the championship for the first time, with their longtime leader Dirk Nowitzki named series MVP.

Cycling
UCI World Tour:
Critérium du Dauphiné, Stage 7:  Joaquim Rodríguez   3h 24' 30"  Thibaut Pinot  + 7"  Robert Gesink  + 7"
Final general classification: (1) Bradley Wiggins   26h 40' 51" (2) Cadel Evans  + 1' 26" (3) Alexander Vinokourov  + 1' 49"
UCI World Tour standings (after 15 of 27 races): (1) Philippe Gilbert  356 points (2) Alberto Contador  349 (3) Michele Scarponi  348
Tour de Suisse, Stage 2:  Mauricio Soler  4h 23' 20"  Damiano Cunego  + 12"  Fränk Schleck  + 12"
General classification (after stage 2): (1) Soler  4h 33' 19" (2) Cunego + 16" (3) Bauke Mollema  + 22"

Football (soccer)
CONCACAF Gold Cup in the United States (teams in bold advance to the quarterfinals):
Group A in Chicago:
 6–1 
 4–1 
Final standings: Mexico 9 points, Costa Rica, El Salvador 4, Cuba 0.
UEFA European Under-21 Championship in Denmark:
Group B:
 2–1  in Viborg
 1–1  in Herning
CAF Confederation Cup Play-off for group stage:
Second leg (first leg score in parentheses):
Kaduna United  3–0 (0–1)  ES Sétif. Kaduna United win 3–1 on aggregate.
Sofapaka  3–1 (0–3)  Club Africain. Club Africain win 4–3 on aggregate.
Only leg: Sunshine Stars  1–0  Al-Ittihad
First leg: Simba  1–0  Motema Pembe
 Argentine Primera División Torneo Clausura, matchday 18 of 19:
Huracán 0–2 Vélez Sarsfield
Lanús 0–1 Argentinos Juniors
Standings: Vélez Sársfield 36 points, Lanús 32, Godoy Cruz 31.
Vélez Sársfield win the title for the eighth time.
 Chilean Primera División Campeonato Apertura Final, second leg (first leg score in parentheses):
Universidad Católica 1–4 (2–0) Universidad de Chile. Universidad de Chile win 4–3 on aggregate.
Universidad de Chile win the title for the 14th time.
 Categoría Primera A Campeonato Apertura Finals, first leg: La Equidad 2–1 Atlético Nacional
 Uruguayan Primera División Championship playoffs in Montevideo: Defensor Sporting 0–1 Nacional
Nacional win the title for the 43rd time.

Golf
PGA Tour:
FedEx St. Jude Classic in Memphis, Tennessee:
Winner: Harrison Frazar  267 (−13)PO
Frazar defeats Robert Karlsson  on the third playoff hole to win his first PGA Tour title.
European Tour:
BMW Italian Open in Turin, Italy:
Winner: Robert Rock  267 (−21)
Rock wins his first European Tour title.
LPGA Tour:
LPGA State Farm Classic in Springfield, Illinois:
Winner: Yani Tseng  267 (−21)
Tseng wins her seventh LPGA Tour title.
Champions Tour:
Greater Hickory Classic at Rock Barn in Conover, North Carolina:
Winner: Mark Wiebe  197 (−19)PO
Wiebe defeats James Mason  on the third playoff hole to win his third Champions Tour title.

Motorcycle racing
Moto GP:
British Grand Prix in Silverstone, United Kingdom:
MotoGP: (1) Casey Stoner  (Honda) (2) Andrea Dovizioso  (Honda) (3) Colin Edwards  (Yamaha)
Riders' championship standings (after 6 of 18 races): (1) Stoner 116 points (2) Jorge Lorenzo  (Yamaha) 98 (3) Dovizioso 83
Moto2: (1) Stefan Bradl  (Kalex) (2) Bradley Smith  (Tech 3) (3) Michele Pirro  (Moriwaki)
Riders' championship standings (after 6 of 17 races): (1) Bradl 127 points (2) Simone Corsi  (FTR) 65 (3) Yuki Takahashi  (Moriwaki) 56
125cc: (1) Jonas Folger  (Aprilia) (2) Johann Zarco  (Derbi) (3) Héctor Faubel  (Aprilia)
Riders' championship standings (after 6 of 17 races): (1) Nicolás Terol  (Aprilia) 128 points (2) Folger 93 (3) Zarco 83
Superbike:
Misano World Championship round in Misano Adriatico, Italy:
Race 1: (1) Carlos Checa  (Ducati 1198) (2) Max Biaggi  (Aprilia RSV4) (3) Marco Melandri  (Yamaha YZF-R1)
Race 2: (1) Checa (2) Biaggi (3) Noriyuki Haga  (Aprilia RSV4)
Riders' championship standings (after 6 of 13 rounds): (1) Checa 245 points (2) Biaggi 173 (3) Melandri 150
Supersport:
Misano World Championship round in Misano Adriatico, Italy: (1) Broc Parkes  (Kawasaki Ninja ZX-6R) (2) Fabien Foret  (Honda CBR600RR) (3) Sam Lowes  (Honda CBR600RR)
Riders' championship standings (after 5 of 12 rounds): (1) Parkes 85 points (2) Chaz Davies  (Yamaha YZF-R6) 80 (3) Luca Scassa  (Yamaha YZF-R6) 70

Tennis
ATP World Tour:
Gerry Weber Open in Halle, Germany:
Final: Philipp Kohlschreiber  def. Philipp Petzschner  7–6(5), 2–0 retired
Kohlschreiber wins the third title of his career.
Aegon Championships in London, United Kingdom:
Final: Jo-Wilfried Tsonga  vs. Andy Murray  — postponed to June 13 due to rain.
WTA Tour:
Aegon Classic in Birmingham, United Kingdom:
Final: Sabine Lisicki  vs. Daniela Hantuchová  — postponed to June 13 due to rain.
e-Boks Sony Ericsson Open in Farum, Denmark:
Final: Caroline Wozniacki  def. Lucie Šafářová  6–1, 6–4
Wozniacki wins the title for the second successive time, for her fifth title of the year and the 17th title of her career.

Volleyball
FIVB World League, Week 3 (team in bold advances to the final round):
Pool A:  1–3 
Standings (after 6 matches): Brazil 15 points, United States 12,  9,  0.
Pool B:  2–3 
Standings (after 6 matches):  18 points,  9, Germany 6, Japan 3.
Pool D:  2–3 
Standings (after 6 matches): Italy 16 points, South Korea 10,  9,  1.
Men's European League, Leg 3:
Pool A:  0–3 
Standings (after 6 matches):  17 points, Belgium 8, Croatia 6,  5.
Pool B:
 3–0 
 0–3 
Standings (after 6 matches): Spain 15 points, Netherlands 14, Greece 7, Austria 0.
Pool C:  3–1 
Standings (after 6 matches): Romania,  12 points, Belarus 7,  5.
Women's European League, Leg 3:
Pool A:
 1–3 
 3–0 
Standings (after 6 matches): Serbia 17 points, France 10, Spain 7, Greece 2.
Pool C:  0–3 
Standings (after 6 matches): Turkey 18 points,  11,  7, Croatia 0.

June 11, 2011 (Saturday)

Athletics
Samsung Diamond League:
Adidas Grand Prix in New York City, United States:
Men:
100m: Steve Mullings  10.26
400m: Jeremy Wariner  45.13
400m hurdles: Javier Culson  48.50
800m: Alfred Kirwa Yego  1:46.57
1500m: David Torrence  3:36.15
5000m: Dejen Gebremeskel  13:05.22
Triple jump: Phillips Idowu  16.67m
Pole vault: Romain Mesnil  5.52m
Women:
100m: Marshevet Myers  11.36
100m hurdles: Danielle Carruthers  13.04
200m: Allyson Felix  22.92
400m: Kaliese Spencer  50.98
800m: Molly Beckwith  2:01.09
1500m: Kenia Sinclair  4:08.06
3000m steeplechase: Milcah Chemos Cheywa  9:27.29
Long jump: Funmi Jimoh  6.48m
High jump: Emma Green  1.94m
Pole vault: Lacy Janson  4.27m
Discus throw: Stephanie Brown Trafton  62.94m
Javelin throw: Christina Obergföll  64.43m

Auto racing
IndyCar Series:
Firestone Twin 275s in Fort Worth, Texas:
Race 1: (1) Dario Franchitti  (Chip Ganassi Racing) (2) Scott Dixon  (Chip Ganassi Racing) (3) Will Power  (Team Penske)
Race 2: (1) Power (2) Dixon (3) Ryan Briscoe  (Team Penske)
Drivers' championship standings (after 7 of 18 races): (1) Power 239 points (2) Franchitti 218 (3) Dixon 169

Basketball
 Ligue Nationale de Basketball Playoffs Final in Paris: Cholet 74–76 Nancy
Nancy win the championship for the second time.

Cricket
India in the West Indies:
3rd ODI in North Sound, Antigua:  225/8 (50 overs);  228/7 (46.2 overs). India win by 3 wickets; lead 5-match series 3–0.

Cycling
UCI World Tour:
Critérium du Dauphiné, Stage 6:  Joaquim Rodríguez  5h 12' 47"  Robert Gesink  + 31"  Jurgen Van den Broeck  + 39"
General classification (after stage 6): (1) Bradley Wiggins   23h 16' 11" (2) Cadel Evans  + 1' 26" (3) Alexander Vinokourov  + 1' 52"
Tour de Suisse, Stage 1:  Fabian Cancellara   9' 41"  Tejay van Garderen  + 9"  Peter Sagan  + 17"

Equestrianism
Show jumping – Global Champions Tour:
4th Competition in Cannes (CSI 5*):  Edwina Alexander  on Itot du Château  Sergio Alvarez Moya  on Action-Breaker  Ludger Beerbaum  on Gotha FRH
Standings (after 4 of 10 competitions): (1) Beerbaum 128.5 points (2) Alexander 125 (3) Denis Lynch  120

Football (soccer)
CONCACAF Gold Cup in the United States (team in bold advances to the quarterfinals):
Group C in Tampa:
 1–0 
 1–2 
Standings (after 2 matches): Panama 6 points, United States, Canada 3, Guadeloupe 0.
UEFA European Under-21 Championship in Denmark:
Group A:
 2–0  in Aarhus
 0–1  in Aalborg
UEFA Women's U-19 Championship in Italy:
Final in Imola:  1–8 
Germany win the title for the sixth time.
CAF Confederation Cup Play-off for group stage, second leg (first leg score in parentheses):
1º de Agosto  1–1 (0–4)  ASEC Mimosas. ASEC Mimosas win 5–1 on aggregate.
Difaa El Jadida  2–2 (0–3)  Inter Luanda. Inter Luanda win 5–2 on aggregate.
Maghreb de Fès  2–0 (0–1)  ZESCO United. Maghreb de Fès win 2–1 on aggregate.

Horse racing
U.S. Thoroughbred Triple Crown:
Belmont Stakes in Elmont, New York:  Ruler on Ice (trainer: Kelly J. Breen; jockey: Jose Valdivia Jr.)  Stay Thirsty (trainer: Todd Pletcher; jockey: Javier Castellano)  Brilliant Speed (trainer: Thomas Albertrani; jockey: Joel Rosario)

Mixed martial arts
UFC 131 in Vancouver, British Columbia, Canada:
Heavyweight bout: Junior dos Santos  def. Shane Carwin  via unanimous decision (30–27, 30–27, 30–26)
Featherweight bout: Kenny Florian  def. Diego Nunes  via unanimous decision (29–28, 29–28, 30–27)
Heavyweight bout: Dave Herman  def. Jon Olav Einemo  via TKO (punches)
Middleweight bout: Mark Muñoz  def. Demian Maia  via unanimous decision (29–28, 29–28, 30–27)
Lightweight bout: Donald Cerrone  def. Vagner Rocha  via unanimous decision (30–27, 30–27, 30–26)

Volleyball
FIVB World League, Week 3 (team in bold advances to the final round):
Pool A:
 3–1 
 0–3 
Standings: Brazil 15 points (5 matches), United States 9 (5), Poland 9 (6), Puerto Rico 0 (6).
Pool B:
 3–0 
 3–2 
Standings: Russia 18 points (6 matches), Bulgaria 9 (6), Germany 5 (5), Japan 1 (5).
Pool C:
 0–3 
 3–0 
Standings (after 6 matches): Argentina 14 points, Serbia 10, Portugal 7, Finland 5.
Pool D:
 1–3 
 2–3 
Standings: Italy 14 points (5 matches), South Korea 9 (5), Cuba 9 (6), France 1 (6).
Men's European League, Leg 3:
Pool A:
 0–3 
 2–3 
Standings: Slovenia 17 points (6 matches), Croatia 6 (5), Belgium 5 (5), Great Britain 5 (6).
Pool B:
 3–0 
 1–3 
Standings (after 5 matches): Spain 12 points, Netherlands 11, Greece 7, Austria 0.
Pool C:
 1–3 
 0–3 
Standings: Romania 12 points (5 matches), Slovakia 12 (6), Turkey 5 (6), Belarus 4 (5).
Women's European League, Leg 3:
Pool A:
 3–2 
 3–2 
Standings (after 5 matches): Serbia 14 points, France 10, Spain 4, Greece 2.
Pool B:
 2–3 
 3–0 
Standings (after 6 matches): Bulgaria 14 points, Czech Republic 13, Hungary 5, Israel 4.
Pool C:
 2–3 
 0–3 
Standings: Turkey 18 points (6 matches), Romania 8 (5), Belarus 7 (5), Croatia 0 (6).

June 10, 2011 (Friday)

Basketball
 National Basketball League Final, Game 6: BK Prostějov 65–82 ČEZ Nymburk. ČEZ Nymburk win best-of-7 series 4–2.
ČEZ Nymburk win the title for the eighth successive time.

Cycling
UCI World Tour:
Critérium du Dauphiné, Stage 5:  Christophe Kern  5h 05' 03"  Chris Anker Sørensen  + 7"  Thomas Voeckler  + 9"
General classification (after stage 5): (1) Bradley Wiggins   18h 02' 30" (2) Cadel Evans  + 1' 11" (3) Janez Brajkovič  + 1' 21"

Football (soccer)
CONCACAF Gold Cup in the United States (team in bold advances to the quarterfinals):
Group B in Miami:
 2–0 
 1–7 
Standings (after 2 matches): Jamaica 6 points, Honduras 4, Guatemala 1, Grenada 0.
CAF Confederation Cup Play-off for group stage, second leg (first leg score in parentheses):
JS Kabylie  2–0 (1–1)  Diaraf. Kabylie win 3–1 on aggregate.

Ice hockey
Stanley Cup Finals (best-of-7 series):
Game 5 in Vancouver: Vancouver Canucks 1, Boston Bruins 0. Canucks lead series 3–2.

Rugby league
International Origin Match in Leeds:  12–16 Exiles

Rugby union
IRB Junior World Championship in Italy:
Pool A:
 8–34  in Padua
 7–64  in Treviso
Pool B in Rovigo:
 54–7 
 24–12 
Pool C:
 33–25  in Treviso
 33–0  in Padua

Volleyball
FIVB World League, Week 3 (team in bold advances to the final round):
Pool A:  0–3 
Standings:  12 points (4 matches),  9 (4), Poland 6 (5), Puerto Rico 0 (5).
Pool B:  3–0 
Standings: Russia 15 points (5 matches), Bulgaria 9 (5),  3 (4),  0 (4).
Pool C:
 2–3 
 2–3 
Standings (after 5 matches): Argentina 11 points, Portugal, Serbia 7, Finland 5.
Men's European League, Leg 3:
Pool A:  1–3 
Standings: Slovenia 14 points (5 matches),  5 (4), Great Britain 5 (5),  3 (4).
Pool C:  3–2 
Standings:  9 points (4 matches), Slovakia 9 (5), Turkey 5 (5),  4 (4).
Women's European League, Leg 3:
Pool B:
 3–0 
 3–2 
Standings (after 5 matches): Czech Republic 12 points, Bulgaria 11, Israel 4, Hungary 3.
Pool C:  0–3 
Standings: Turkey 15 points (5 matches),  6 (4), Croatia 0 (5).

June 9, 2011 (Thursday)

Athletics
Samsung Diamond League:
Bislett Games in Oslo, Norway:
Men:
110m hurdles: Aries Merritt  13.12
200m: Usain Bolt  19.86
800m Nordic: Johan Rogestedt  1:48.60
1500m: Nicholas Kemboi  3:37.25
One mile: Asbel Kiprop  3:50.86
3000m steeplechase: Paul Kipsiele Koech  8:01.83
Long jump: Godfrey Khotso Mokoena  8.08m
High jump: Kyriakos Ioannou  2.28m
Discus throw: Gerd Kanter  65.14m
Javelin throw: Matthias de Zordo  83.94m
Women:
100m: Ivet Lalova  11.01
100m hurdles: Christina Vukicevic  12.79
400m: Amantle Montsho  50.10
400m hurdles: Zuzana Hejnová  54.38
800m: Halima Hachlaf  1:58.27
1500m: Viktoria Tegenfeldt  4:16.99
5000m: Meseret Defar  14:37.32
Triple jump: Yargelis Savigne  14.81m
Pole vault: Fabiana Murer  4.60m
Shot put: Valerie Adams  20.26m

Baseball
Major League Baseball news: The Oakland Athletics, currently in last place in the American League West and in the midst of a 9-game losing streak, fire manager Bob Geren, becoming the first team to do so this season. Former Arizona Diamondbacks and Seattle Mariners manager Bob Melvin is named as Geren's interim replacement.

Basketball
 NBA Finals (best-of-7 series):
Game 5 in Dallas: Dallas Mavericks 112, Miami Heat 103. Mavericks lead series 3–2.

Cycling
UCI World Tour:
Critérium du Dauphiné, Stage 4:  John Degenkolb  4h 15' 41"  Edvald Boasson Hagen   s.t.  Juan José Haedo  s.t.
General classification (after stage 4): (1) Bradley Wiggins   12h 57' 18" (2) Cadel Evans  + 1' 11" (3) Janez Brajkovič  + 1' 21"

Football (soccer)
CONCACAF Gold Cup in the United States (team in bold advances to the quarterfinals):
Group A in Charlotte:
 1–1 
 0–5 
Standings (after 2 matches): Mexico 6 points, Costa Rica 4, El Salvador 1, Cuba 0.
 Chilean Primera División Campeonato Apertura Final, first leg: Universidad de Chile 0–2 Universidad Católica

Volleyball
FIVB World League, Week 3:
Pool D:  1–3 
Standings:  11 points (4 matches),  9 (4), Cuba 7 (5), France 0 (5).

June 8, 2011 (Wednesday)

Basketball
 League of Serbia Final, Game 3: Partizan 86–69 Hemofarm. Partizan win best-of-5 series 3–0.
Partizan win the title for the tenth successive time and 18th time overall.

Cricket
India in the West Indies:
2nd ODI in Port of Spain, Trinidad:  240/9 (50 overs);  183/3 (33.4/37 overs). India win by 7 wickets (D/L); lead 5-match series 2–0.

Cycling
UCI World Tour:
Critérium du Dauphiné, Stage 3:  Tony Martin  55' 27"  Bradley Wiggins   + 11"  Edvald Boasson Hagen   + 43"
General classification (after stage 3): (1) Wiggins  8h 41' 37" (2) Cadel Evans  + 1' 11" (3) Janez Brajkovič  + 1' 21"

Football (soccer)
Friendly international (top 10 in FIFA World Rankings):
(7)  1–1 (2) 
UEFA Women's U-19 Championship in Italy:
Semifinals:
 2–3  in Bellaria
 3–1  in Imola
 Copa do Brasil Finals, second leg (first leg score in parentheses):
Coritiba 3–2 (0–1) Vasco da Gama. 3–3 on points, 3–3 on aggregate; Vasco da Gama win on away goals.
Vasco win the Cup for the first time.

Ice hockey
Stanley Cup Finals (best-of-7 series):
Game 4 in Boston: Boston Bruins 4, Vancouver Canucks 0. Series tied 2–2.

June 7, 2011 (Tuesday)

Basketball
 NBA Finals (best-of-7 series):
Game 4 in Dallas: Dallas Mavericks 86, Miami Heat 83. Series tied 2–2.

Cricket
Sri Lanka in England:
2nd Test in London, day 5:  486 & 335/7d (78.1 overs; Alastair Cook 106);  479 & 127/3 (43 overs). Match drawn; England lead 3-match series 1–0.

Cycling
UCI World Tour:
Critérium du Dauphiné, Stage 2:  John Degenkolb  4h 02' 39"  Samuel Dumoulin  s.t.  Sébastien Hinault  s.t.
General classification (after stage 2): (1) Alexander Vinokourov   7h 45' 48" (2) Jurgen Van den Broeck   + 11" (3) Bradley Wiggins   + 11"

Football (soccer)
CONCACAF Gold Cup in the United States:
Group C in Detroit:
 3–2 
 2–0 
UEFA Euro 2012 qualifying, matchday 8:
Group A:  1–3 
Standings: Germany 21 points (7 matches),  11 (7),  10 (6),  7 (6), Azerbaijan 3 (6).
Group C:  2–0 
Standings:  16 points (6 matches),  11 (7),  8 (6), Estonia 7 (7),  6 (5), Faroe Islands 4 (7).
Group D:
 2–0 
 2–0 
Standings:  13 points (6 matches), Belarus 12 (7), Bosnia and Herzegovina 10 (6), Albania 8 (6), Luxembourg 1 (7).
Group E:
 5–0 
 0–3 
Standings:  18 points (6 matches), Sweden 15 (6), Hungary 12 (7), Finland 6 (6), San Marino 0 (7).
Friendly internationals (top 10 in FIFA World Rankings):
 0–3 (1) 
(3)  1–0 
(9)  0–2  in Liège, Belgium
Friendly women's internationals (top 10 in FIFA Women's World Rankings):
(2)  5–0 
 0–1 (6)

June 6, 2011 (Monday)

Cricket
Sri Lanka in England:
2nd Test in London, day 4:  486 & 149/2 (41 overs);  479 (131.4 overs). England lead by 156 runs with 8 wickets remaining.
India in the West Indies:
1st ODI in Port of Spain, Trinidad:  214/9 (50 overs);  217/6 (44.5 overs). India win by 4 wickets; lead 5-match series 1–0.

Cycling
UCI World Tour:
Critérium du Dauphiné, Stage 1:  Jurgen Van den Broeck  3h 36' 42"  Joaquim Rodríguez  + 6"  Cadel Evans  + 7"
General classification (after stage 1): (1) Alexander Vinokourov   3h 43' 09" (2) Van Den Broeck  + 5" (3) Evans + 7"

Football (soccer)
CONCACAF Gold Cup in the United States:
Group B in Carson:
 4–0 
 0–0

Ice hockey
Stanley Cup Finals (best-of-7 series):
Game 3 in Boston: Boston Bruins 8, Vancouver Canucks 1. Canucks lead series 2–1.

June 5, 2011 (Sunday)

Auto racing
Sprint Cup Series:
STP 400 in Kansas City, Kansas: (1)  Brad Keselowski (Dodge; Penske Racing) (2)  Dale Earnhardt Jr. (Chevrolet; Hendrick Motorsports) (3)  Denny Hamlin (Toyota; Joe Gibbs Racing)
Drivers' championship standings (after 13 of 36 races): (1)  Carl Edwards (Ford; Roush Fenway Racing) 485 points (2)   Jimmie Johnson (Chevrolet; Hendrick Motorsports) 445 (3) Earnhardt Jr. 444
World Touring Car Championship:
Race of Hungary in Budapest:
Race 1: (1) Alain Menu  (Chevrolet; Chevrolet Cruze) (2) Norbert Michelisz  (Zengõ-Dension Team, BMW 320 TC) (3) Javier Villa  (Proteam Racing, BMW 320 TC)
Race 2: (1) Yvan Muller  (Chevrolet; Chevrolet Cruze) (2) Rob Huff  (Chevrolet; Chevrolet Cruze) (3) Gabriele Tarquini  (Lukoil – SUNRED, SEAT León)
Drivers' championship standings (after 4 of 12 rounds): (1) Huff 150 points (2) Muller 119 (3) Menu 104

Basketball
FIBA Asia Champions Cup in Pasig, Philippines:
7th place game: Al-Ittihad Jeddah  104–95  Duhok Sports Club
5th place game: Al-Jalaa Aleppo  65–72  ASU Sports
3rd place game: Smart Gilas  64–71   Al-Rayyan
Finals game:  Mahram Tehran  82–91   Al-Riyadi Beirut
Al-Riyadi Beirut win the title for the first time.
 NBA Finals (best-of-7 series):
Game 3 in Dallas: Miami Heat 88, Dallas Mavericks 86. Heat lead series 2–1.
 HEBA A1 Playoffs Final, Game 4: Panathinaikos 101–94 (OT) Olympiacos. Panathinaikos win best-of-5 series 3–1.
Panathinaikos win the title for the ninth successive time and 32nd time overall.

Cricket
Sri Lanka in England:
2nd Test in London, day 3:  486;  372/3 (102.2 overs; Tillakaratne Dilshan 193). Sri Lanka trail by 114 runs with 7 wickets remaining in the 1st innings.

Cycling
UCI World Tour:
Critérium du Dauphiné, Prologue:  Lars Boom   6' 18"  Alexander Vinokourov  + 2"  Bradley Wiggins  + 5"

Equestrianism
Show jumping – CSIO Schweiz in St. Gallen (CSIO 5*):
 Grand Prix:  Nick Skelton  on Carlo  Rich Fellers  on Flexible  Christine McCrea  on Take One
Show jumping – Deutsches Spring-Derby in Hamburg:  Andre Thieme  on Nacorde  Torben Köhlbrandt  on C-Trenton Z  Marcel Ewen  on Orgueil Fontaine

Football (soccer)
CONCACAF Gold Cup in the United States:
Group A in Arlington:
 5–0 
 5–0 
Africa Cup of Nations qualification, matchday 4: (teams in bold qualify for the Finals)
Group A:
 2–1 
 1–0 
Standings (after 4 matches): Cape Verde 7 points, Mali 6, Zimbabwe 5, Liberia 4.
Group B:
 2–2 
 4–1 
Standings (after 4 matches): Guinea 10 points, Nigeria 7, Ethiopia 4, Madagascar 1.
Group C:  1–1 
Standings (after 4 matches):  9 points, Libya 8,  4, Comoros 1.
Group D:  2–1 
Standings (after 4 matches): , Central African Republic 7 points, Tanzania,  4.
Group E:  1–2 
Standings (after 4 matches):  10 points, Congo DR 7,  5, Mauritius 0.
Group G:  0–0 
Standings (after 4 matches): South Africa 8 points,  6,  5, Egypt 2.
Group H:
 3–1 
 2–6 
Standings (after 4 matches): Côte d'Ivoire 12 points, Burundi, Benin 4, Rwanda 3.
Group I:  1–2 
Standings (after 4 matches): , Sudan 10 points,  3, Swaziland 0.
Group J:  1–0 
Standings (after 4 matches):  10 points, Angola 6, Kenya 4,  3.
Group K:
 0–0 
 5–0 
Standings: Botswana 17 points (7 matches), Tunisia, Malawi 10 (6),  3 (6), Chad 2 (7).
Friendly international (top 10 in FIFA World Rankings):
 2–1 (5) 
Friendly women's international (top 10 in FIFA Women's World Rankings):
(1)  1–0 
UEFA Women's U-19 Championship in Italy: (teams in bold advance to the semifinals)
Group A:
 1–3  in Bellaria
 0–0  in Cervia
Final standings: Italy 9 points, Switzerland, Russia 4, Belgium 0.
Group B:
 1–2  in Imola
 5–1  in Forlì
Final standings: Germany 9 points, Norway 6, Netherlands, Spain 1.

Golf
PGA Tour:
Memorial Tournament in Dublin, Ohio:
Winner: Steve Stricker  272 (−16)
Stricker wins his tenth PGA Tour title.
European Tour:
Saab Wales Open in Newport, Wales:
Winner: Alex Norén  275 (−9)
Norén wins his second European Tour title.
LPGA Tour:
ShopRite LPGA Classic in Galloway, New Jersey:
Winner: Brittany Lincicome  202 (−11)
Lincicome wins her fourth LPGA Tour title.
Champions Tour:
Principal Charity Classic in West Des Moines, Iowa:
Winner: Bob Gilder  199 (−14)
Gilder wins his tenth Champions Tour title, and first since 2006.

Motorcycle racing
Moto GP:
Catalan Grand Prix in Montmeló, Spain:
MotoGP: (1) Casey Stoner  (Honda) (2) Jorge Lorenzo  (Yamaha) (3) Ben Spies  (Yamaha)
Riders' championship standings (after 5 of 18 races): (1) Lorenzo 98 points (2) Stoner 91 (3) Andrea Dovizioso  (Honda) 63
Moto2: (1) Stefan Bradl  (Kalex) (2) Marc Márquez  (Suter) (3) Aleix Espargaró  (Pons Kalex)
Riders' championship standings (after 5 of 17 races): (1) Bradl 102 points (2) Simone Corsi  (FTR) 59 (3) Andrea Iannone  (Suter) & Julián Simón  (Suter) 49
125cc: (1) Nicolás Terol  (Aprilia) 120 points (2) Maverick Viñales  (Aprilia) (3) Jonas Folger  (Aprilia)
Riders' championship standings (after 5 of 17 races): (1) Terol 120 points (2) Sandro Cortese  (Aprilia) 72 (3) Folger 68

Rugby union
IRB Junior World Trophy in Georgia:
7th place game:  30–29 
5th place game:  24–49 
3rd place game:  15–20  
Final:   31–24  
Samoa qualify for the 2012 IRB Junior World Championship.

Tennis
French Open in Paris, France, day 15:
Men's singles - Final: Rafael Nadal [1]  def. Roger Federer  [3] 7–5, 7–6(3), 5–7, 6–1
Nadal wins the French Open for the sixth time and equals the record of Björn Borg , and his tenth Grand Slam title.
Boys' singles - Final: Bjorn Fratangelo  def. Dominic Thiem  [14] 3–6, 6–3, 8–6
Fratangelo wins his first junior Grand Slam title.
Girls' singles - Final: Ons Jabeur  [9] def. Monica Puig  [5] 7–6(8), 6–1
Jabeur wins her first junior Grand Slam title, and becomes the first Tunisian player to win any Grand Slam title.
Legends Under 45 Doubles Final: Fabrice Santoro /Todd Woodbridge  def. Arnaud Boetsch /Cédric Pioline  6–2, 6–4
Legends Over 45 Doubles Final: Guy Forget /Henri Leconte  def. Andrés Gómez /John McEnroe  6–3, 5–7, [10–8]
Women's Legends Doubles Final: Lindsay Davenport /Martina Hingis  def. Martina Navratilova /Jana Novotná  6–1, 6–2

Triathlon
ITU World Championships, Leg 2 in Madrid, Spain:
Women:  Paula Findlay  2:03:46  Helen Jenkins  2:03:49  Emmie Charayron  2:03:58
Standings (after 2 of 6 legs): (1) Findlay 1600 points (2) Barbara Riveros Diaz  1326 (3) Andrea Hewitt  1318

Volleyball
FIVB World League, Week 2 (team in bold advances to the final round):
Pool A:  3–1 
Standings (after 4 matches): Brazil 12 points,  9, Poland 3,  0.
Pool B:  3–0 
Standings (after 4 matches):  12 points, Bulgaria 9,  3, Japan 0.
Pool D:
 3–1 
 3–2 
Standings (after 4 matches): Italy 11 points, South Korea 9, Cuba 4, France 0.
Men's European League, Leg 2:
Pool A:
 3–1 
 3–2 
Standings (after 4 matches): Slovenia 11 points, Great Britain, Croatia 5, Belgium 3.
Pool B:  3–0 
Standings (after 4 matches):  9 points, Netherlands 8, Greece 7,  0.
Pool C:
 1–3 
 3–1 
Standings (after 4 matches): Romania 9 points, Slovakia 8, Belarus 4, Turkey 3.
Women's European League, Leg 2:
Pool C:
 3–0 
 3–0 
Standings (after 4 matches): Turkey 12 points, Belarus, Romania 6, Croatia 0.

June 4, 2011 (Saturday)

Athletics
Samsung Diamond League:
Prefontaine Classic in Eugene, United States:
Men:
100m: Steve Mullings  9.80
110m hurdles: David Oliver  12.94
200m: Walter Dix  20.19
400m: Angelo Taylor  45.16
800m: Abubaker Kaki Khamis  1:43.68
Bowerman mile: Haron Keitany  3:49.09
International mile: Ryan Gregson  3:53.86
3000m steeplechase: Ezekiel Kemboi  8:08.34
2 miles: Bernard Lagat  8:13.62
High jump: Raúl Spank  2.32m
Long jump: Greg Rutherford  8.32m
Shot put: Reese Hoffa  21.65m
Discus throw: Robert Harting  68.40m
Women:
100m: Carmelita Jeter  10.70
400m: Amantle Montsho  50.59
400m hurdles: Lashinda Demus  53.31
800m: Kenia Sinclair  1:58.29
1500m: Gelete Burka  4:04.63
Triple jump: Olha Saladukha  14.98m
Pole vault: Anna Rogowska  4.68m
Shot put: Nadzeya Astapchuk  20.59m
Javelin throw: Christina Obergföll  65.48m

Auto racing
Nationwide Series:
STP 300 in Joliet, Illinois: (1)  Justin Allgaier (Chevrolet; Turner Motorsports) (2)  Carl Edwards (Ford; Roush Fenway Racing) (3)  Trevor Bayne (Ford; Roush Fenway Racing)
Drivers' championship standings (after 14 of 34 races): (1)  Reed Sorenson (Chevrolet; Turner Motorsports) 488 points (2)  Elliott Sadler (Chevrolet; Kevin Harvick Incorporated) 486 (3)  Ricky Stenhouse Jr. (Ford; Roush Fenway Racing) 482

Basketball
FIBA Asia Champions Cup in Pasig, Philippines:
5th to 8th classification:
Al-Ittihad Jeddah  77–85  Al-Jalaa Aleppo
Duhok Sports Club  90–98  ASU Sports
Semi-finals:
Mahram Tehran  80–77  Smart Gilas
Al-Riyadi Beirut  71–52  Al-Rayyan

Cricket
Sri Lanka in England:
2nd Test in London, day 2:  486 (112.5 overs; Matt Prior 126);  231/1 (63 overs; Tillakaratne Dilshan 127*). Sri Lanka trail by 255 runs with 9 wickets remaining in the 1st innings.
India in the West Indies:
Only T20I in Port of Spain, Trinidad:  159/6 (20 overs);  143/5 (20 overs). India win by 16 runs.

Equestrianism
Show jumping – Global Champions Tour:
3rd Competition in Hamburg (CSI 5*):  Rolf-Göran Bengtsson  on Casall  Ludger Beerbaum  on Chaman  Janne Friederike Meyer  on Lambrasco
Standings (after 3 of 10 competitions): (1) Álvaro de Miranda Neto  98 points (2) Beerbaum 93.5 (3) Denis Lynch  88
Show jumping – CSIO Schweiz in St. Gallen (CSIO 5*):
Grosses Jagdspringen:  Ben Maher  on Oscar IX  Rich Fellers  on Mc Guinness  Janika Sprunger  on Komparse

Football (soccer)
UEFA Euro 2012 qualifying, matchday 7:
Group B:
 3–1 
 1–0 
 0–2 
Standings (after 6 matches): Slovakia, Russia, Republic of Ireland 13 points, Armenia 8, Macedonia 4, Andorra 0.
Group F:
 1–2 
 3–1 
Standings: Greece 14 points (6 matches),  13 (6), Israel 13 (7),  9 (7), Latvia 4 (6), Malta 0 (6).
Group G:
 2–2 
 1–1 
Standings: England, Montenegro 11 points (5 matches), Switzerland, Bulgaria 5 (5),  0 (4).
Group H:
 0–2 
 1–0 
Standings: Portugal, Norway, Denmark 10 points (5 matches),  2 (4), Iceland 1 (5).
Africa Cup of Nations qualification, matchday 4:
Group C:  3–0 
Standings: Zambia 9 points (4 matches),  7 (3), Mozambique 4 (4),  0 (3).
Group D:  4–0 
Standings: Morocco 7 points (4 matches),  4 (3), Algeria 4 (4).
Group E:  0–0 
Standings: Senegal 10 points (4 matches), Cameroon 5 (4),  4 (3),  0 (3).
Group F:  1–4 
Standings: Burkina Faso 9 points (3 matches),  3 (2), Namibia 0 (3).
Group G:  1–0 
Standings:  7 points (3 matches), Niger 6 (4), Sierra Leone 5 (4),  1 (3).
Group J:  2–0 
Standings: Uganda 10 points (4 matches),  4 (3),  3 (3), Guinea-Bissau 3 (4).
Friendly international: (top 10 in FIFA World Rankings)
 0–4 (1) 
(3)  0–0 (2)

Horse racing
English Thoroughbred Triple Crown:
Epsom Derby in Epsom:  Pour Moi (trainer: André Fabre; jockey: Mickael Barzalona)  Treasure Beach (trainer: Aidan O'Brien; jockey: Colm O'Donoghue)  Carlton House (trainer: Michael Stoute; jockey: Ryan L. Moore)

Ice hockey
Stanley Cup Finals (best-of-7 series):
Game 2 in Vancouver: Vancouver Canucks 3, Boston Bruins 2 (OT). Canucks lead series 2–0.

Mixed martial arts
The Ultimate Fighter 13 Finale in Las Vegas, United States:
Welterweight bout: Chris Cope  def. Chuck O'Neil  via unanimous decision
Light Heavyweight bout: Kyle Kingsbury  def. Fabio Maldonado  via unanimous decision
Middleweight bout: Ed Herman  def. Tim Credeur  via TKO (punches)
Lightweight bout: Clay Guida  def. Anthony Pettis  via unanimous decision
Welterweight bout: Tony Ferguson  def. Ramsey Nijem  via KO (punches)

Rugby union
 Top 14 Final in Saint-Denis: Toulouse 15–10 Montpellier
Toulouse lift the Bouclier de Brennus for the 18th time.

Tennis
French Open in Paris, France, day 14:
Women's singles - Final: Li Na  [6] def. Francesca Schiavone [5]  6–4, 7–6(0)
Li becomes the first player from Asia to win a Grand Slam singles title.
Men's doubles - Final: Max Mirnyi /Daniel Nestor  [2] def. Juan Sebastián Cabal /Eduardo Schwank 7–6(3), 3–6, 6–4
Mirnyi and Nestor both win their third French Open men's doubles title; Mirnyi wins his fifth Grand Slam men's doubles title, and Nestor his seventh.
Boys' doubles - Final: Andrés Artunedo /Roberto Carballés  [4] def. Mitchell Krueger /Shane Vinsant  5–7, 7–6(5), [10–5]
Artunedo and Carballes both win their first junior Grand Slam title.
Girls' doubles - Final: Irina Khromacheva /Maryna Zanevska  [2] def. Victoria Kan /Demi Schuurs  6–4, 7–5
Khromacheva wins her first junior Grand Slam doubles title, and Zanevska wins her second.

Triathlon
ITU World Championships, Leg 2 in Madrid, Spain:
Men:  Alistair Brownlee  1:51:06  Jonathan Brownlee  1:51:09  Javier Gómez  1:51:51
Standings (after 2 of 6 legs): (1) Gómez 1485 points (2) Jonathan Brownlee 1480 (3) Dmitry Polyanski  983

Volleyball
FIVB World League, Week 2 (team in bold advances to the final round):
Pool A:
 3–0 
 1–3 
Standings: Brazil 9 points (3 matches), United States 9 (4), Poland 3 (3), Puerto Rico 0 (4).
Pool B:
 3–0 
 3–1 
Standings: Russia 12 points (4 matches), Bulgaria 6 (3), Germany 3 (4), Japan 0 (3).
Pool C:
 3–0 
 1–3 
Standings (after 4 matches): Argentina 9 points, Serbia 6, Portugal 5, Finland 4.
Pool D:  3–1 
Standings (after 3 matches):  9 points, South Korea 6,  3, France 0.
Men's European League, Leg 2:
Pool A:
 3–0 
 0–3 
Standings (after 3 matches): Slovenia 9 points, Great Britain 5, Croatia 4, Belgium 0.
Pool B:
 3–1 
 3–2 
Standings: Spain 9 points (4 matches), Greece 7 (3), Netherlands 5 (3), Austria 0 (4).
Pool C:
 0–3 
 3–2 
Standings (after 3 matches): Romania 6 points, Slovakia 5, Belarus 4, Turkey 3.
Women's European League, Leg 2:
Pool A:
 0–3 
 3–0 
Standings (after 4 matches): Serbia 12 points, France 9, Spain 3, Greece 0.
Pool B:
 0–3 
 0–3 
Standings (after 4 matches): Czech Republic, Bulgaria 9 points, Hungary, Israel 3.
Pool C:
 3–0 
 3–0 
Standings (after 3 matches): Turkey 9 points, Romania 6, Belarus 3, Croatia 0.

June 3, 2011 (Friday)

Athletics
Samsung Diamond League:
Prefontaine Classic in Eugene, United States:
Men:
10000m: Mo Farah  26:46.57
25000m: Moses Mosop  1:12:25.4 (WR)
30000m: Mosop 1:26:47.4 (WR)
Women's 5000m: Vivian Cheruiyot  14:33.96

Basketball
FIBA Asia Champions Cup in Pasig, Philippines:
Quarter-finals:
Al-Riyadi Beirut  106–80  Duhok Sports Club
Mahram Tehran  102–65  Al-Ittihad Jeddah
Smart Gilas  85–80  Al-Jalaa Aleppo
ASU Sports  77–83  Al-Rayyan

Cricket
Sri Lanka in England:
2nd Test in London, day 1:  342/6 (88 overs); .

Equestrianism
FEI Nations Cup Show Jumping:
Nations Cup of Switzerland in St. Gallen (CSIO 5*):   (Eric van der Vleuten, Piet Raijmakers jr., Maikel van der Vleuten, Jur Vrieling)   (Tim Stockdale, Robert Smith, Scott Brash, Nick Skelton) &  (Steve Guerdat, Werner Muff, Janika Sprunger, Pius Schwizer)
Standings (after 3 of 8 events): (1) Netherlands 23.5 points (2)  19 (3)  18

Football (soccer)
UEFA Euro 2012 qualifying, matchday 7:
Group A:
 2–1 
 1–2 
 1–1 
Standings: Germany 18 points (6 matches), Belgium 11 (7), Turkey 10 (6), Austria 7 (6), Azerbaijan 3 (5), Kazakhstan 3 (6).
Group C:
 0–2 
 3–0 
Standings: Italy 16 points (6 matches), Slovenia 11 (7),  8 (6), Estonia 7 (6),  6 (5), Faroe Islands 1 (6).
Group D:
 3–0 
 1–1 
Standings: France 13 points (6 matches), Belarus 9 (6),  8 (5), Romania 8 (6), Bosnia and Herzegovina 7 (5),  1 (6).
Group E:
 0–1 
 1–4 
Standings:  18 points (6 matches), Sweden 12 (5),  9 (6), Moldova 6 (6), Finland 6 (5), San Marino 0 (6).
Group F:  2–1 
Standings: Croatia 13 points (6 matches),  11 (5),  10 (6), Georgia 9 (7),  4 (5),  0 (5).
Group I:  2–0 
Standings:  15 points (5 matches),  9 (5),  4 (4), Lithuania 4 (5), Liechtenstein 3 (5).
Africa Cup of Nations qualification, matchday 4:
Group I:  3–1 
Standings: Ghana 10 points (4 matches),  7 (3), Congo 3 (4),  0 (3).
Friendly women's international (top 10 in FIFA Women's World Rankings):
(2)  5–0

Tennis
French Open in Paris, France, day 13:
Men's singles - Semifinals:
Rafael Nadal  [1] def. Andy Murray  [4] 6–4, 7–5, 6–4
Nadal reaches his sixth French Open final in seven years, which ties Björn Borg's record for the Open era, and his twelfth Grand Slam final.
Roger Federer  [3] def. Novak Djokovic  [2] 7–6(5), 6–3, 3–6, 7–6(5)
Federer reaches his fifth French Open final, and his 23rd Grand Slam final.
Djokovic's 43-match winning streak ends, the third longest streak behind Ivan Lendl and Guillermo Vilas.
Women's doubles - Final: Andrea Hlaváčková /Lucie Hradecká  def. Sania Mirza /Elena Vesnina  [7] 6–4, 6–3
Hlaváčková and Hradecká both win their first Grand Slam title.
Wheelchair men's singles Final: Maikel Scheffers  def. Nicolas Peifer  7–6(3), 6–3
Scheffers wins his first Grand Slam title.
Wheelchair women's singles Final: Esther Vergeer  [1] def. Marjolein Buis  6–0, 6–2
Vergeer wins her fifth consecutive French Open singles title and her 18th Grand Slam singles title.
Wheelchair men's doubles Final: Shingo Kunieda /Peifer  [1] def. Robin Ammerlaan /Stefan Olsson  6–2, 6–3
Kunieda wins his third French Open doubles title, and tenth Grand Slam doubles title.
Peifer wins his first Grand Slam title.
Wheelchair women's doubles Final: Vergeer /Sharon Walraven  [1] def. Jiske Griffioen /Aniek van Koot  [2] 5–7, 6–4, [10–5]
Vergeer wins her fourth French Open doubles title, and 17th Grand Slam doubles title.
Walraven wins her fourth consecutive Grand Slam title.

Volleyball
FIVB World League, Week 2 (team in bold advances to the final round):
Pool A:  1–3 
Standings:  6 points (2 matches), United States 6 (3),  3 (2), Puerto Rico 0 (3).
Pool B:  3–0 
Standings: Russia 9 points (3 matches),  3 (2), Germany 3 (3),  0 (2).
Pool C:
 1–3 
 0–3 
Standings (after 3 matches): Argentina 6 points, Portugal 5, Finland 4, Serbia 3.
Men's European League, Leg 2:
Pool B:  3–1 
Standings:  6 points (2 matches), Spain 6 (3),  3 (2), Austria 0 (3).
Women's European League, Leg 2:
Pool A:
 0–3 
 3–0 
Standings (after 3 matches): Serbia 9 points, France 6, Spain 3, Greece 0.
Pool B:
 0–3 
 1–3 
Standings (after 3 matches): Czech Republic, Bulgaria 6 points, Hungary, Israel 3.

June 2, 2011 (Thursday)

Basketball
 NBA Finals (best-of-7 series):
Game 2 in Miami: Dallas Mavericks 95, Miami Heat 93. Series tied 1–1.

Football (soccer)
UEFA Women's U-19 Championship in Italy (teams in bold advance to the semi-finals):
Group A:
 1–0  in Cervia
 3–1  in Forlì
Standings (after 2 matches): Italy 6 points, Switzerland, Russia 3, Belgium 0.
Group B:
 1–0  in Bellaria
 3–0  in Imola
Standings (after 2 matches): Germany 6 points, Norway 3, Spain, Netherlands 1.
Copa Libertadores Semifinals, second leg: (first leg score in parentheses)
Vélez Sársfield  2–1 (0–1)  Peñarol. 3–3 on points, 2–2 on aggregate; Peñarol win on away goals.

Tennis
French Open in Paris, France, day 12:
Women's singles - Semifinals:
Li Na  [6] def. Maria Sharapova  [7] 6–4, 7–5
Li reaches her second consecutive Grand Slam final.
Francesca Schiavone  [5] def. Marion Bartoli  [11] 6–3, 6–3
Schiavone reaches the final for the second successive year.
Mixed doubles - Final: Casey Dellacqua /Scott Lipsky  def. Katarina Srebotnik /Nenad Zimonjić  [1] 7–6(6), 4–6, [10–7]
Dellacqua and Lipsky both win their first Grand Slam title.

Volleyball
FIVB World League, Week 2:
Pool D:  3–0 
Standings: Italy 9 points (3 matches),  3 (2), Cuba 3 (3),  0 (2).

June 1, 2011 (Wednesday)

Basketball
FIBA Asia Champions Cup in Pasig, Philippines (teams in bold advance to the quarterfinals):
Group A:
Al-Ittihad Jeddah  98–76  KL Dragons
ASU Sports  74–76  Smart Gilas
Final standings: Smart Gilas 8 points, ASU Sports 7, Al-Ittihad Jeddah 6,  Duhok Sports Club 5, KL Dragons 4.
Group B:
Mahram Tehran  81–64  Al-Rayyan Sports
Al-Riyadi Beirut  86–73  Al-Jalaa Aleppo
Final standings: Al-Riyadi Beirut 8 points, Mahram Tehran 7, Al-Rayyan Sports 6, Al-Jalaa Aleppo 5,  Al Shabab 4.

Football (soccer)
Friendly international: (top 10 in FIFA World Rankings)
 4–1 (5) 
Copa Libertadores Semifinals, second leg: (first leg score in parentheses)
Cerro Porteño  3–3 (0–1)  Santos. Santos win 4–1 on points.
 Copa do Brasil Finals, first leg: Vasco da Gama 1–0 Coritiba

Ice hockey
Stanley Cup Finals (best-of-7 series):
Game 1 in Vancouver: Vancouver Canucks 1, Boston Bruins 0. Canucks lead series 1–0.

Rugby union
IRB Junior World Trophy in Georgia (teams in bold advance to the final):
Group A:
 33–5 
 50–14 
Final standings: Samoa 15 points, Uruguay 9, Russia 5, United States 2.
Group B:
 49–23 
 14–29 
Final standings: Japan 14 points, Georgia 10, Canada 5, Zimbabwe 0.

Tennis
French Open in Paris, France, day 11:
Men's singles - Quarterfinals:
Rafael Nadal  [1] def. Robin Söderling  [5] 6–4, 6–1, 7–6(3)
Andy Murray  [4] def. Juan Ignacio Chela  7–6(2), 7–5, 6–2
Women's singles - Quarterfinals:
Li Na  [6] def. Victoria Azarenka  [4] 7–5, 6–2
Maria Sharapova  [7] def. Andrea Petkovic  [15] 6–0, 6–3

References

6